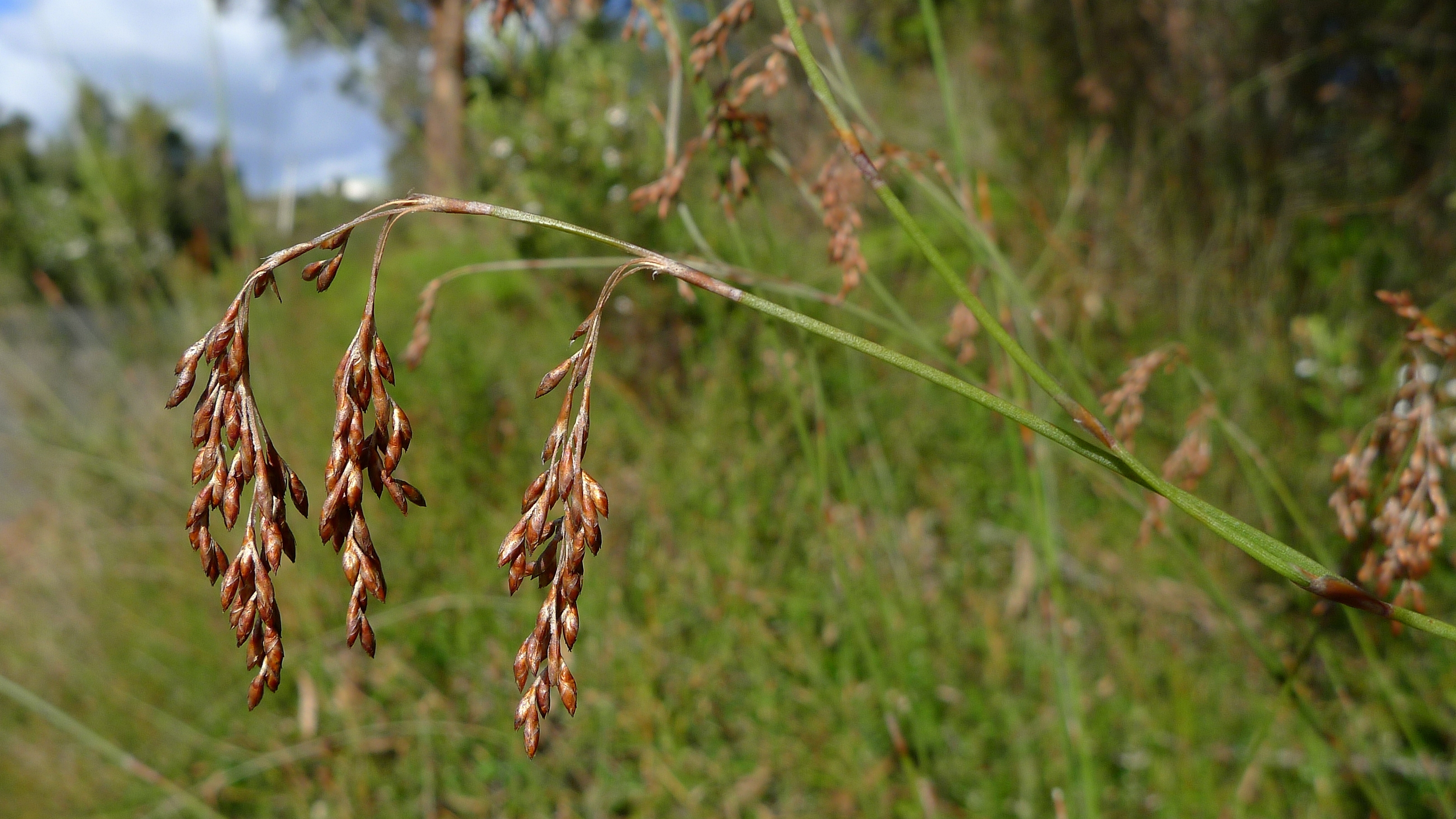

Scientific classification
- Kingdom: Plantae
- Clade: Tracheophytes
- Clade: Angiosperms
- Clade: Monocots
- Clade: Commelinids
- Order: Poales
- Family: Restionaceae
- Genus: Leptocarpus; R. Br. 1810 not Willd. ex Link 1820 (syn of Tamonea in Verbenaceae)

Synonyms
- Schoenodum Labill.

= Leptocarpus (plant) =

Genus of flowering plants

Leptocarpus is a genus of dioecious rush-like perennial plants described as a genus in 1810.

The genus as currently conceived is entirely endemic to Australia. A few species native to other places were formerly included, but they have been moved to other genera.

== Species ==
The following species are accepted as of 2021:

- Leptocarpus canus Nees
- Leptocarpus coangustatus Nees
- Leptocarpus crassipes Pate & Meney
- Leptocarpus crebriculmis B.G.Briggs
- Leptocarpus decipiens B.G.Briggs
- Leptocarpus denmarkicus (Suess.) B.G.Briggs
- Leptocarpus depilatus B.G.Briggs
- Leptocarpus kraussii B.G.Briggs
- Leptocarpus laxus (R.Br.) B.G.Briggs
- Leptocarpus roycei B.G.Briggs
- Leptocarpus scariosus R.Br.
- Leptocarpus scoparius B.G.Briggs
- Leptocarpus tenax (Labill.) R.Br.
- Leptocarpus tephrinus B.G.Briggs
- Leptocarpus thysananthus B.G.Briggs
- Leptocarpus trisepalus (Nees) B.G.Briggs

=== Formerly included ===
Over 70 other names have been published using the name Leptocarpus, but they have been transferred to other genera, including the following:

Apodasmia, Chaetanthus, Dapsilanthus, Empodisma, Hydrophilus, Hypolaena, Lepyrodia, Meeboldina, Restio, Rhodocoma, Staberoha, Willdenowia.

=== Name in homonymic genus ===
In 1820, the name Leptocarpus was applied to some plants in the Verbenaceae. Thus was created an illegitimate homonym. One species name was included in the illegitimate genus, i.e.:

- Leptocarpus chamaedrifolius Willd. – Tamonea spicata Aubl.
