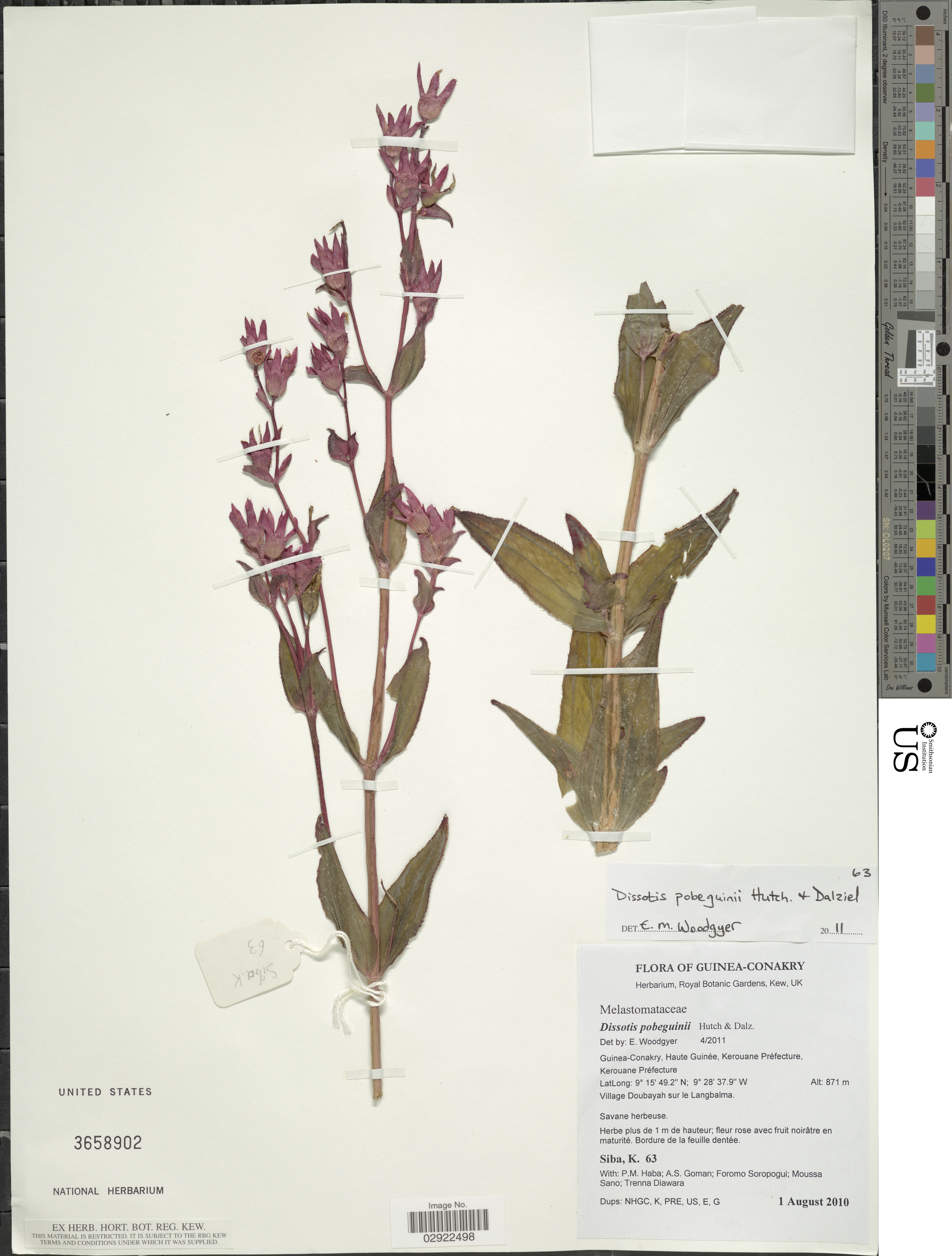

Conservation status
- Vulnerable (IUCN 3.1)

Scientific classification
- Kingdom: Plantae
- Clade: Tracheophytes
- Clade: Angiosperms
- Clade: Eudicots
- Clade: Rosids
- Order: Myrtales
- Family: Melastomataceae
- Genus: Anaheterotis; Ver.-Lib. & G.Kadereit
- Species: A. pobeguinii

Binomial name
- Anaheterotis pobeguinii (Hutch. & Dalziel) Ver.-Lib. & G.Kadereit

Synonyms
- Dissotis pobeguinii Hutch. & Dalziel; Heterotis pobeguinii (Hutch. & Dalziel) Jacq.-Fél.

= Anaheterotis =

Genus of flowering plants

Anaheterotis pobeguinii is a herb of the family Melastomataceae, in the monospecific genus Anaheterotis. Its species name is a homage to French explorer Charles-Henri Pobéguin.

== Range ==
It is distributed in tropical West Africa; endemic to the Woodland savanna of Guinea and Sierra Leone. It grows along rivers at an altitude of 1200–1400 meters.

== Description ==
It is an upright, unbranched herb, with a pale, simple stem, but well-branched terminal inflorescence. The flowers are purple to red. It grows up to 60 cm tall. The plant is a geophyte, growing from a tuberous rootstock.
