= Alfred Meebold =

German botanist (1863–1952)

Alfred Karl Meebold (Heidenheim an der Brenz, Kingdom of Württemberg, September 29, 1863 – January 6, 1952, Havelock North, New Zealand) was a botanist, writer, and anthroposophist.

== Life ==
Meebold worked at his father's factory, in the Württembergische Cattunmanufactur factory in Heidenheim an der Brenz, which produced indienne printed cottons that imitated Indian patterns.

He travelled to India three times, first in 1904, and to Australia and New Zealand for the first time in 1928. Meebold became a personal student of Rudolf Steiner. Between 1928 and 1938 he spent many months in Budapest, Hungary, where he worked at the first non-German-language Waldorf school in the world. Its founder was Nagy Emilné Göllner Mária (later, in Switzerland known as Maria von Nagy).

Meebold left Europe in 1938, intending to relocate to New Zealand. He was delayed in Hawaii because of World War II, and was not able to leave Honolulu until after 1945.

== Botanical Collecting ==
Meebold was a prolific botanical collector. In Australasian herbaria there are over 1539 specimens that he collected, with more than 1,000 specimens held by the National Herbarium of Victoria Royal Botanic Gardens Victoria. Outside of Australasia, his specimens are held by the Ludwig-Maximilians-Universität München and the Botanische Staatssammlung München.

The endemic Australian plant genus Meeboldina is named in his honour, as are the species Darwinia meeboldii, Acacia meeboldii, and Geranium meeboldii.

He was also honoured in 1924, when botanist H.Wolff published a genus of flowering plants from Central Asia, belonging to the family Apiaceae as 'Meeboldia.

== Works ==
- Luzie's Testament, short stories (1895–1898)
- Vox Humana, short stories (1895–1898, Berlin)
- Sarolta, novel (1904, Berlin)
- Das Erwachen der Seele, novel (1907, Munich)
- Indien (1907, Berlin)
- Der Weg zum Geist, auto-biography (1917 and 1920, Munich)
- Irrmansdorf, novel (1926–1927, Basel)
- Hotel Mooswald, novel (1928, Basel)
- Der botanische Wandersmann, poems (1931, Oedenburg)
- Zwischen Elf und Engel, poems (1933, Oedenburg)
- Kurs zur Einführung in die Anthroposophie Rudolf Steiners, 6 lectures in Vienna, 1931. (1936)
