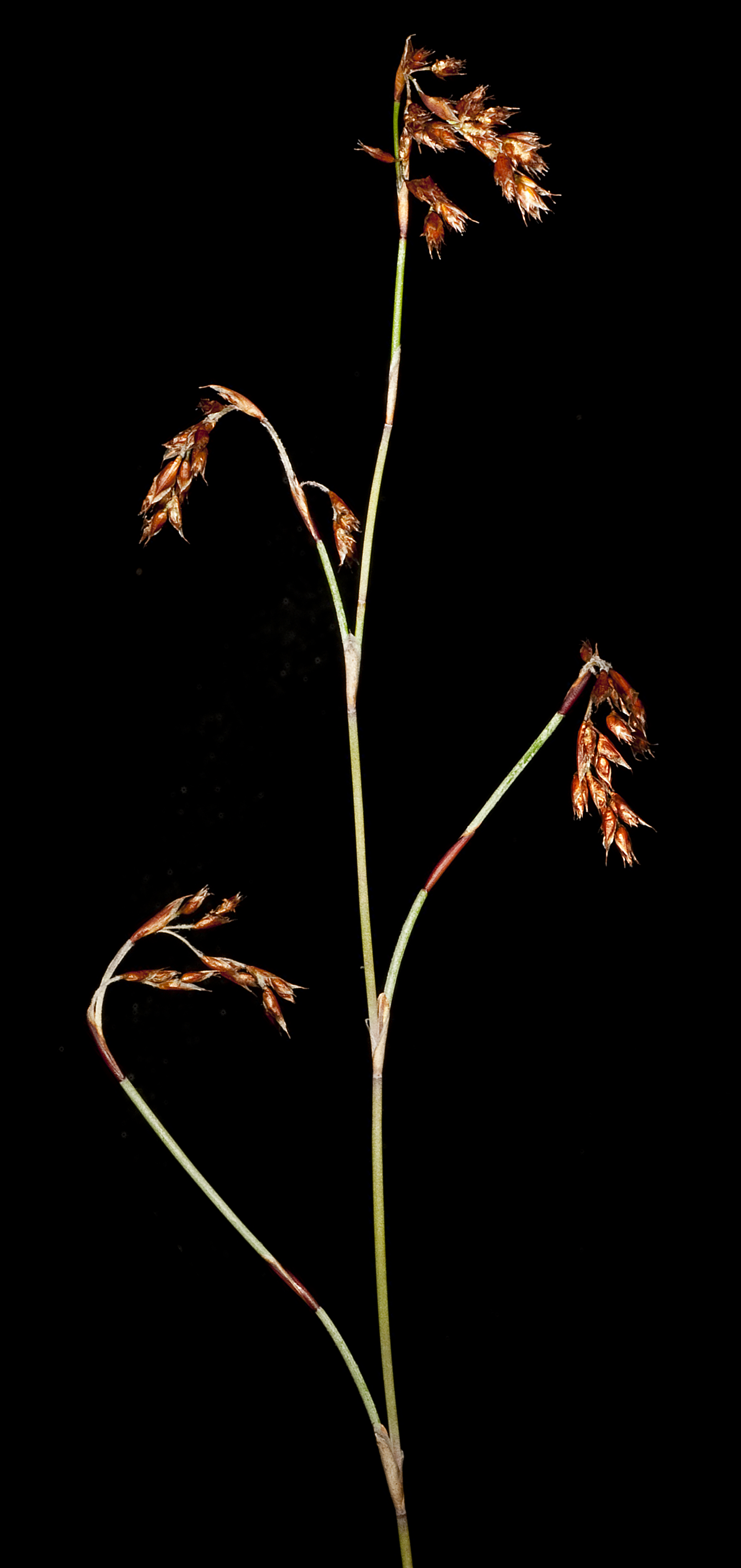
- Meeboldina coangustata

Scientific classification
- Kingdom: Plantae
- Clade: Tracheophytes
- Clade: Angiosperms
- Clade: Monocots
- Clade: Commelinids
- Order: Poales
- Family: Restionaceae
- Genus: Meeboldina; Suess.

= Meeboldina =

Genus of flowering plants

Meeboldina is a plant genus in the family Restionaceae, described as a genus in 1943. It is named for the botanical collector Alfred Meebold.

The entire genus is endemic to the State of Western Australia.

However in 2014, the genus Leptocarpus was expanded to include Meeboldina and by 2021 the species listed below had all been transferred to the genus, Leptocarpus.

Species

- Meeboldina cana (Nees) B.G.Briggs & L.A.S.Johnson
- Meeboldina coangustata (Nees) B.G.Briggs & L.A.S.Johnson
- Meeboldina crassipes (Pate & Meney) B.G.Briggs & L.A.S.Johnson
- Meeboldina denmarkica Suess.
- Meeboldina scariosa (R.Br.) B.G.Briggs & L.A.S.Johnson
