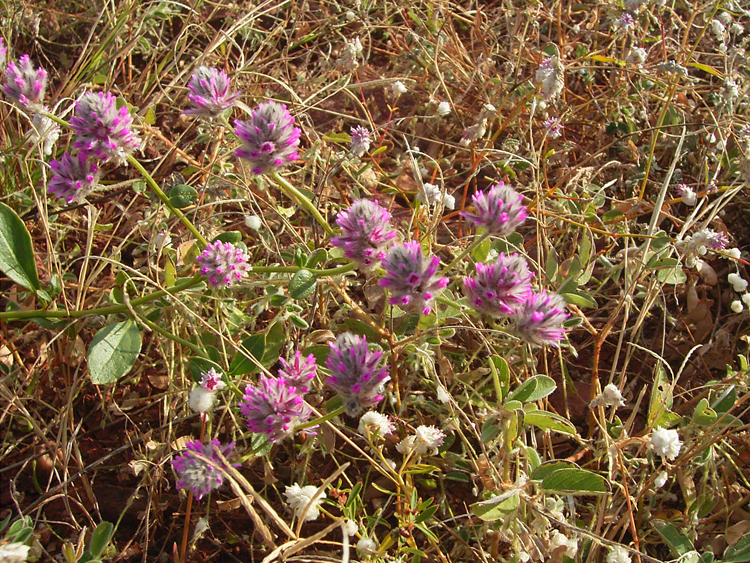

Conservation status
- Priority Three — Poorly Known Taxa (DEC)

Scientific classification
- Kingdom: Plantae
- Clade: Tracheophytes
- Clade: Angiosperms
- Clade: Eudicots
- Order: Caryophyllales
- Family: Amaranthaceae
- Genus: Ptilotus
- Species: P. carinatus

Binomial name
- Ptilotus carinatus Benl

= Ptilotus carinatus =

Species of grass-like plant

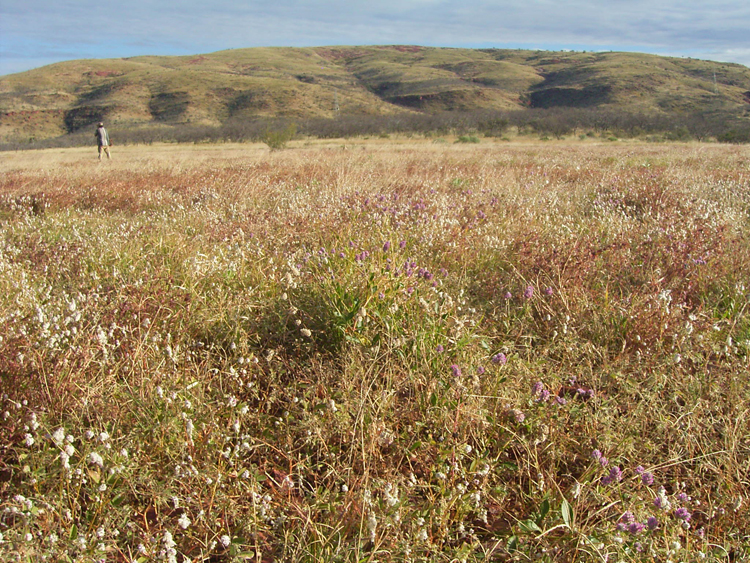
Habit in Karijini National Park

Ptilotus carinatus is a species of flowering plant in the family Amaranthaceae and is endemic to the north of Western Australia. It is a short-lived, prostrate to low-lying annual herb with egg-shaped leaves and spikes of purple-mauve or magenta-coloured flowers.

== Description ==
Ptilotus carinatus is a short-lived, annual herb that typically grows to a height of 10–70 cm (3.9–27.6 in). Its leaves are egg-shaped, 4–130 mm (0.16–5.12 in) long and 1–48 mm (0.039–1.890 in) wide. The flowers are borne in oval or cylindrical spikes 10–60 mm (0.39–2.36 in) long and 12–20 mm (0.47–0.79 in) wide with densely arranged flowers. There are hairy bracts 3.8–4.9 mm (0.15–0.19 in) long and hairy bracteoles 4.0–5.6 mm (0.16–0.22 in) long. The outer tepals are 7.7–8.3 mm (0.30–0.33 in) long and the inner tepals are 6.6–7.7 mm (0.26–0.30 in) long. There are two fertile stamens, three staminode, and the ovary is hairy with a curved style 1.9–2.6 mm (0.075–0.102 in) long. Flowering occurs from April to October.

== Taxonomy ==
Ptilotus carinatus was first formally described in 1958 by Gerhard Benl in Mitteilungen der Botanischen Staatssammlung Munchen from specimens collected in Wittenoom Gorge in 1952.

== Distribution and habitat ==
This species of Ptilotus grows in stony clay and alluvium in the Gascoyne and Pilbara bioregions of northern Western Australia.

== Conservation status ==
Ptilotus carinatus is listed as "not threatened" by the Government of Western Australia Department of Biodiversity, Conservation and Attractions.

== See also ==
- List of Ptilotus species
