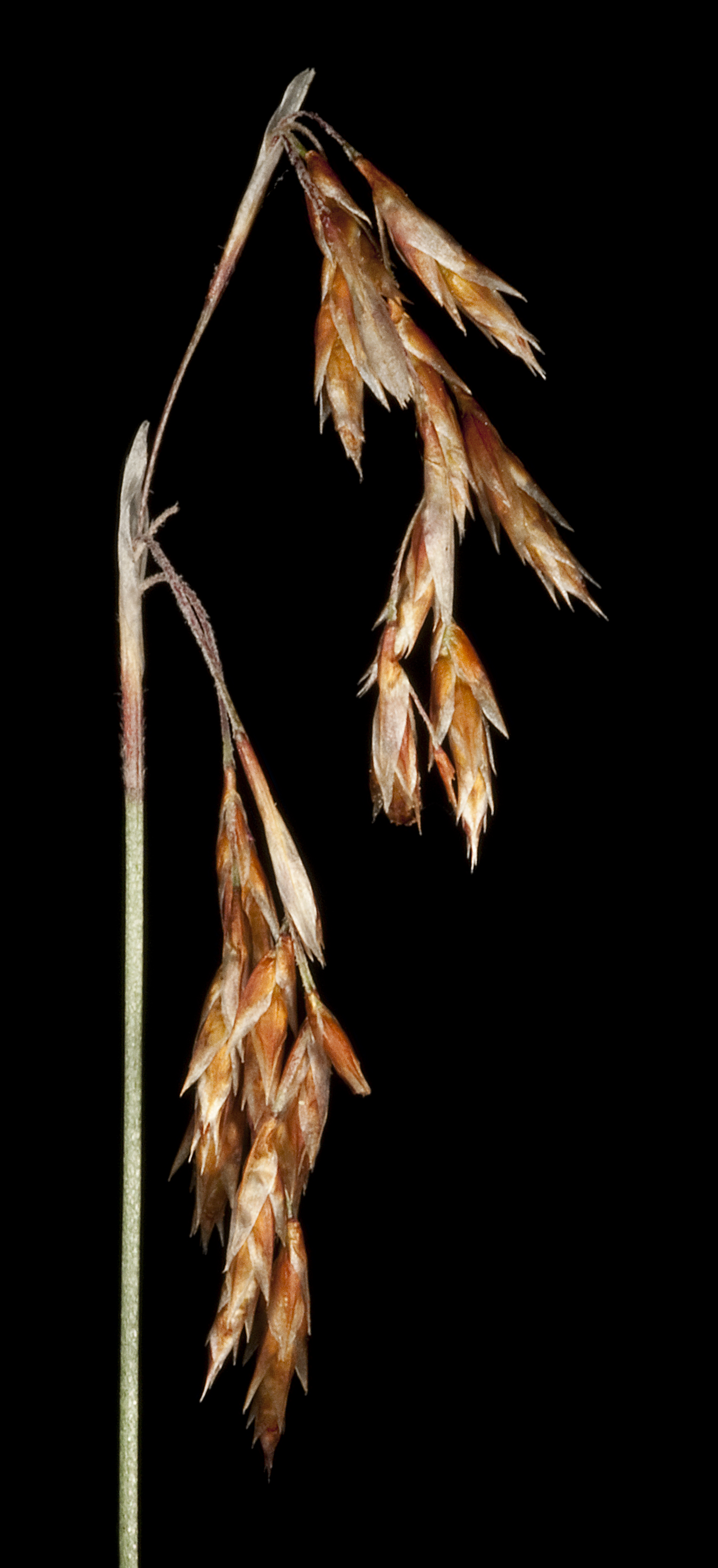

Scientific classification
- Kingdom: Plantae
- Clade: Tracheophytes
- Clade: Angiosperms
- Clade: Monocots
- Clade: Commelinids
- Order: Poales
- Family: Restionaceae
- Genus: Leptocarpus
- Species: L. denmarkicus

Binomial name
- Leptocarpus denmarkicus (Suess.) B.G.Briggs

Synonyms
- Meeboldina denmarkica Suess.

= Leptocarpus denmarkicus =

Species of plant

Leptocarpus denmarkicus is a species of plant in the Restionaceae (rush) family, endemic to Western Australia.

It was first described in 1943 by Karl Suessenguth as Meeboldina denmarkica. However, in 2014, the genus Leptocarpus was expanded by Barbara Briggs to include Meeboldina and the species name became Leptocarpus denmarkicus.
