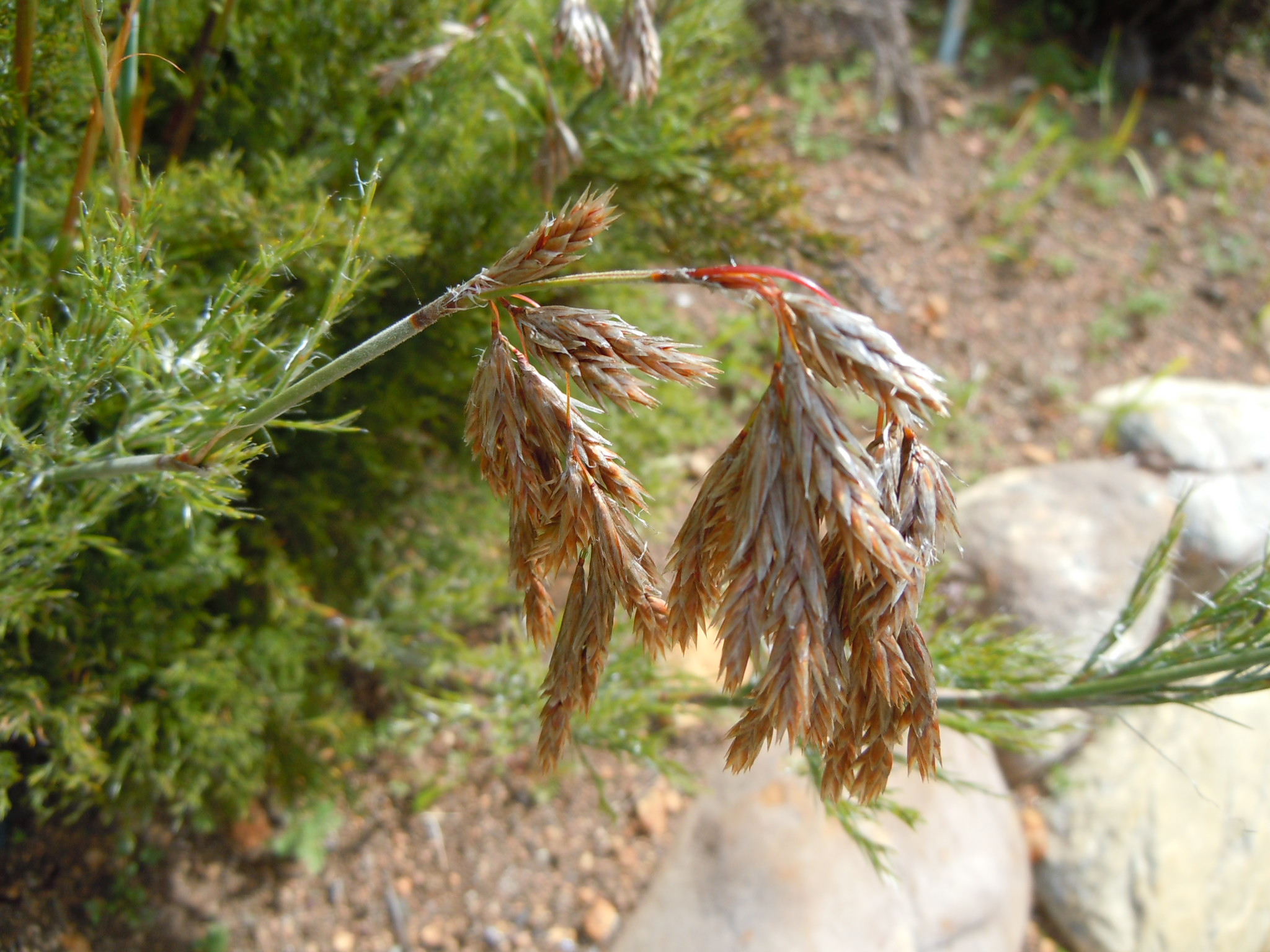
- Thamnochortus cinereus

Scientific classification
- Kingdom: Plantae
- Clade: Embryophytes
- Clade: Tracheophytes
- Clade: Spermatophytes
- Clade: Angiosperms
- Clade: Monocots
- Clade: Commelinids
- Order: Poales
- Family: Restionaceae
- Genus: Thamnochortus; P.J.Bergius

Type species
- Thamnochortus fruticosus P.J.Bergius

= Thamnochortus =

Genus of plants

Thamnochortus is a group of plants in the Restionaceae described as a genus in 1767. The entire genus is endemic to Cape Province in South Africa.

Species

- Thamnochortus acuminatus
- Thamnochortus amoena
- Thamnochortus arenarius
- Thamnochortus bachmannii
- Thamnochortus cinereus
- Thamnochortus dumosus
- Thamnochortus ellipticus
- Thamnochortus erectus
- Thamnochortus fraternus
- Thamnochortus fruticosus
- Thamnochortus glaber
- Thamnochortus gracilis
- Thamnochortus guthrieae
- Thamnochortus insignis
- Thamnochortus kammanassiae
- Thamnochortus karooica
- Thamnochortus levynsiae
- Thamnochortus lucens
- Thamnochortus muirii
- Thamnochortus nutans
- Thamnochortus obtusus
- Thamnochortus paniculatus
- Thamnochortus papyraceus
- Thamnochortus pellucidus
- Thamnochortus platypteris
- Thamnochortus pluristachyus
- Thamnochortus pulcher
- Thamnochortus punctatus
- Thamnochortus rigidus
- Thamnochortus scabridus
- Thamnochortus schlechteri
- Thamnochortus spicigerus
- Thamnochortus sporadicus
- Thamnochortus stokoei

formerly included

moved to other genera: Cannomois Hypodiscus Restio Rhodocoma Staberoha

- T. aemulus - Staberoha aemula
- T. argenteus (Thunb.) Kunth 1841 not Pillans 1928 - Hypodiscus argenteus
- T. cernuus - Staberoha cernua
- T. debilis - Restio debilis
- T. distichus - Restio distichus
- T. giganteus - Rhodocoma gigantea
- T. imbricatus - Staberoha distachyos
- T. imbricatus var. stenopterus - Staberoha cernua
- T. membranaceus - Restio distichus
- T. micans - Restio micans
- T. modestus - Rhodocoma fruticosa
- T. occultus - Restio occultus
- T. robustus - Cannomois robusta
- T. scirpoides - Cannomois scirpoides
- T. strictus - Cannomois parviflora
- T. umbellatus - Staberoha distachyos
- T. virgatus - Cannomois virgata

== Gallery ==
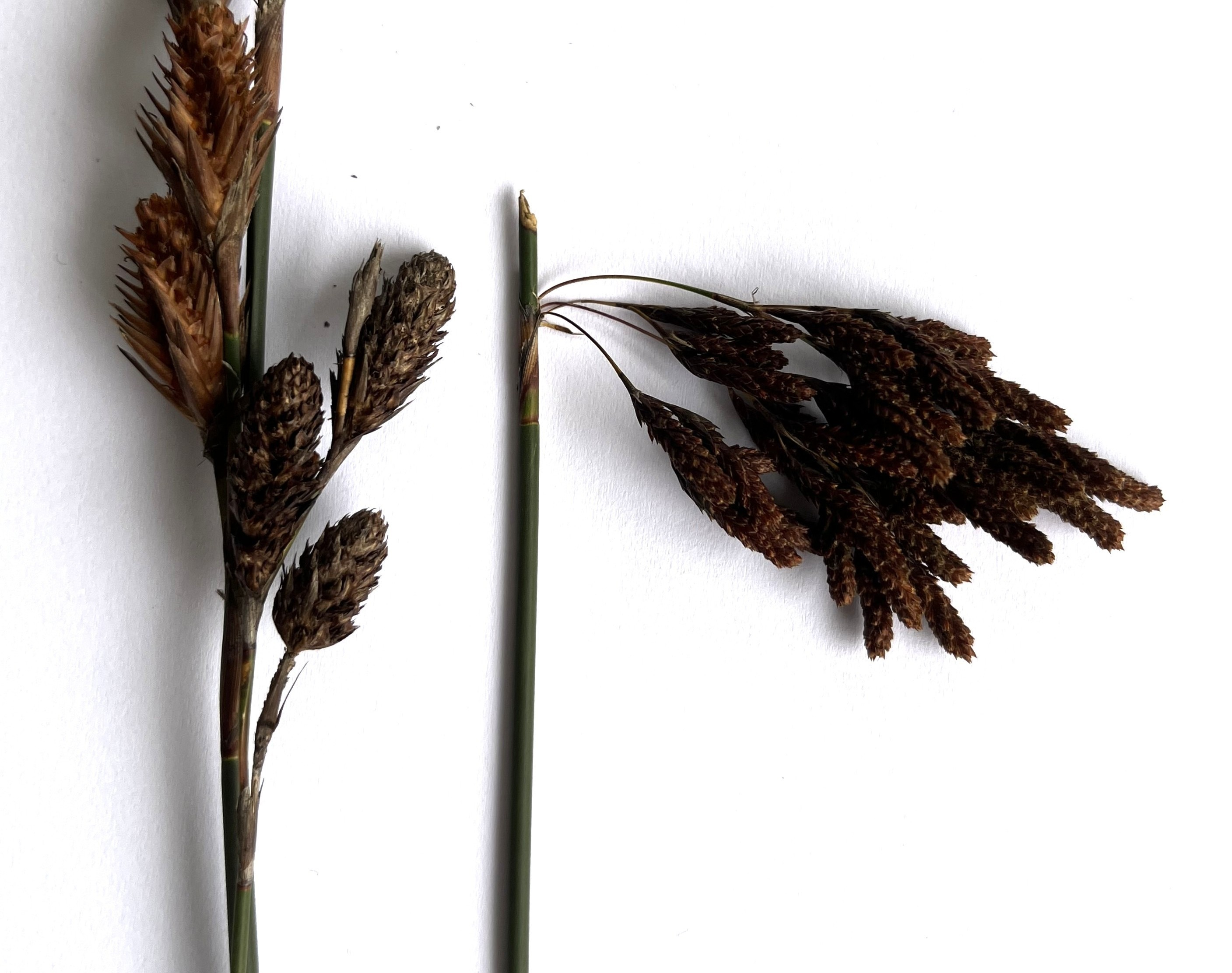
Female (left) and male heads of Thamnochortus spicigerus

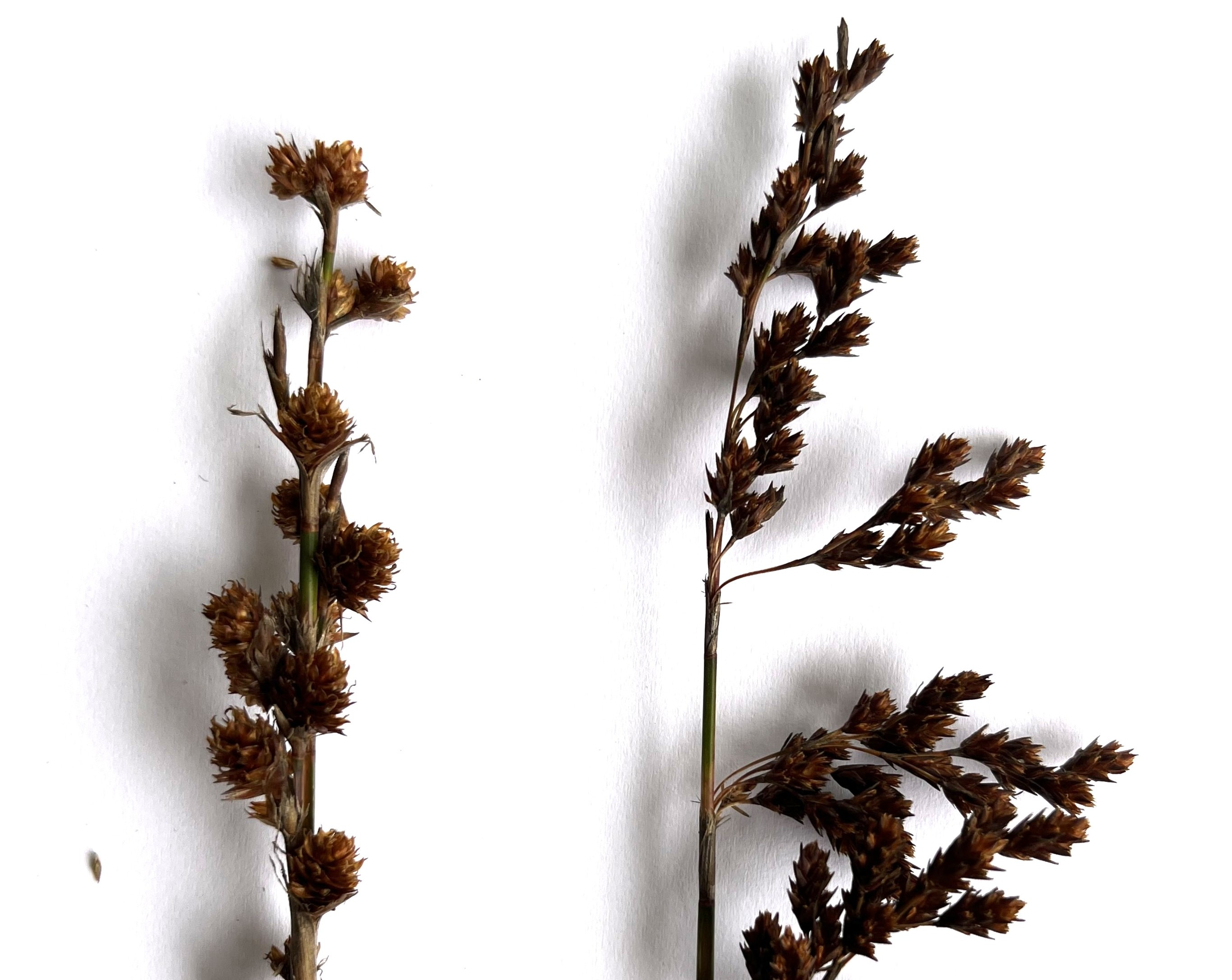
Female (left) and male heads of Thamnochortus erectus

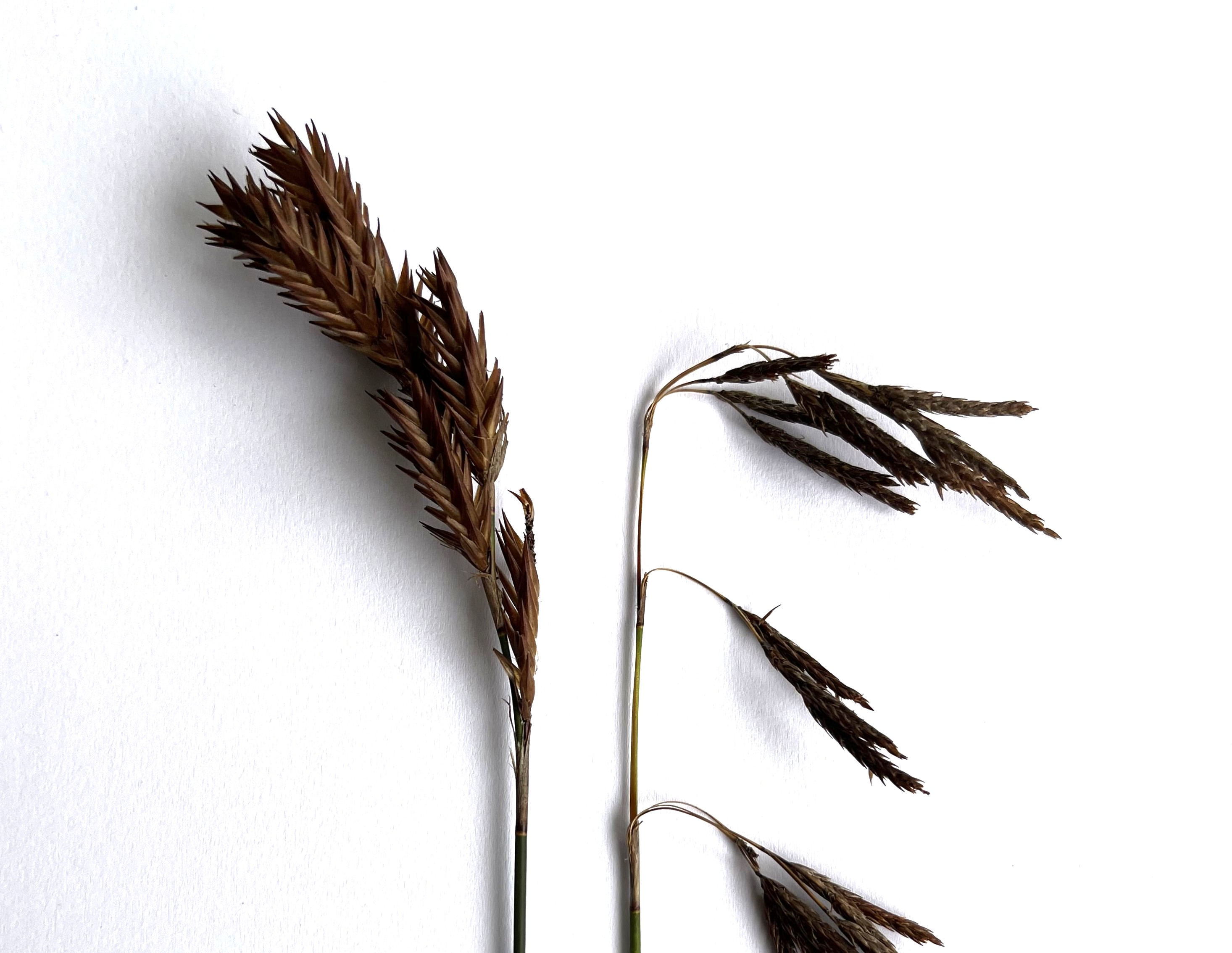
Female (left) and male heads of Thamnochortus insignis
