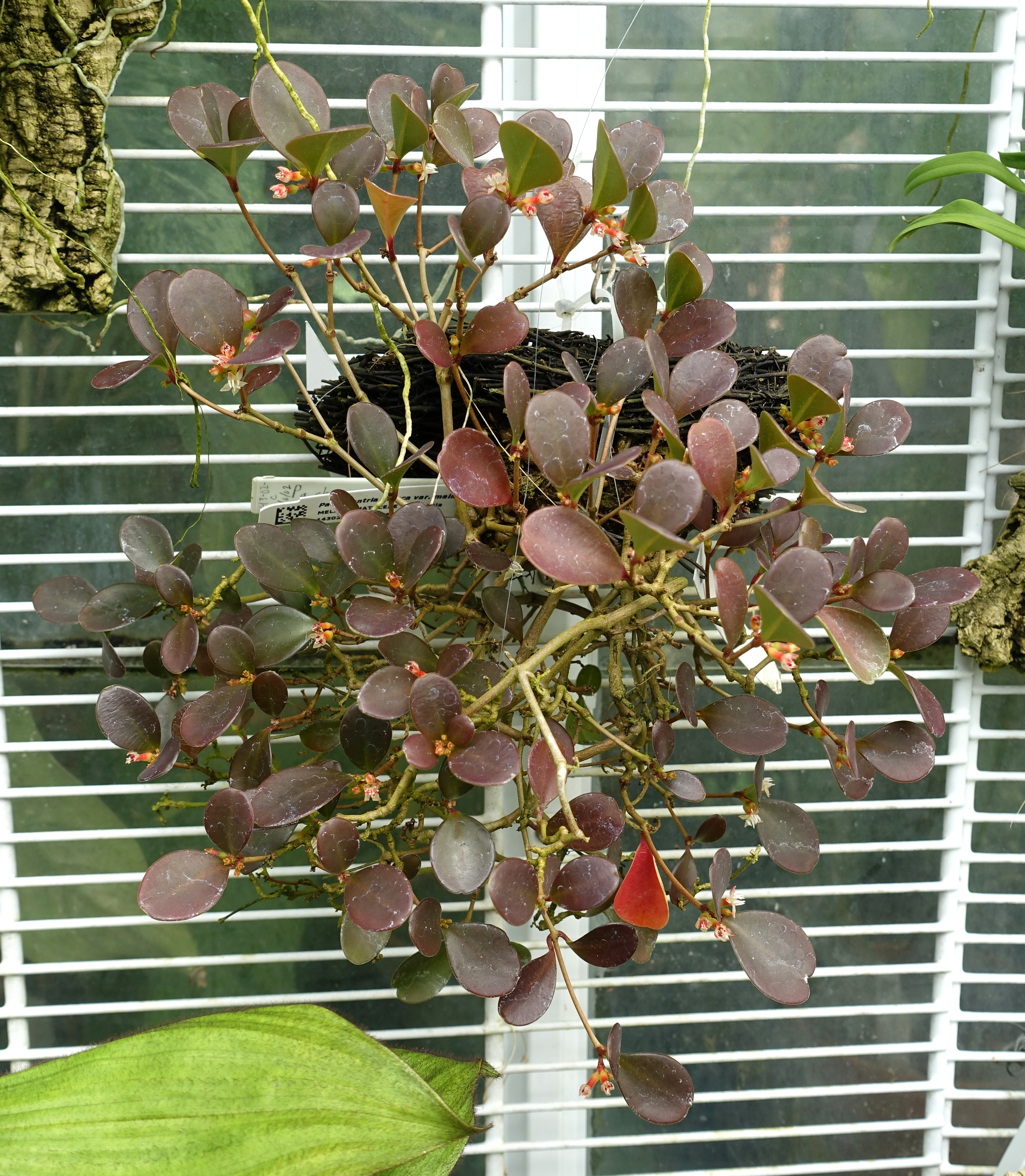

Scientific classification
- Kingdom: Plantae
- Clade: Tracheophytes
- Clade: Angiosperms
- Clade: Eudicots
- Clade: Rosids
- Order: Myrtales
- Family: Melastomataceae
- Genus: Pachycentria
- Species: P. glauca

Binomial name
- Pachycentria glauca Triana

= Pachycentria glauca =

Species of shrub in Melastomataceae family

Pachycentria glauca

Scientific classification
- Kingdom: Plantae
- Clade: Tracheophytes
- Clade: Angiosperms
- Clade: Eudicots
- Clade: Rosids
- Order: Myrtales
- Family: Melastomataceae
- Genus: Pachycentria
- Species: P. glauca
- Subspecies: P. g. subsp. glauca

Trinomial name
- Pachycentria glauca subsp. glauca Triana

Pachycentria glauca

Scientific classification
- Kingdom: Plantae
- Clade: Tracheophytes
- Clade: Angiosperms
- Clade: Eudicots
- Clade: Rosids
- Order: Myrtales
- Family: Melastomataceae
- Genus: Pachycentria
- Species: P. glauca
- Subspecies: P. g. subsp. maingayi

Trinomial name
- Pachycentria glauca subsp. maingayi (C.B.Clarke) Clausing

Synonyms
- Medinilla maingayi C.B.Clarke; Pachycentria maingayi (Cl.) J.F.Maxwell

Pachycentria glauca is a small epiphytic shrub in the Melastomataceae family. It has 2 subspecies: P. glauca subsp. glauca and P. glauca subsp. maingayi. The glauca subspecies is endemic to Borneo, the maingayi subspecies is native to Peninsular Malaysia and Thailand, perhaps Sumatra. It grows on trees, other epiphytes (so, a double epiphyte) and rocks in partial shade. It is intimately associated with particular ant species, growing on their gardens, providing a home for them, feeding them and having its seeds dispersed by them.

== Description ==
The species is a small shrub, epiphytic, with many hanging, creeping or erect branches and adventitious roots that have irregular, globose swellings up to 2 cm in diameter. These swellings have the same anatomical structure as a storage root. The round branchlets have minute scales, with the older branches are stunted and have thickened node, the globose swellings. Leaves are elliptic-lanceolate or obovate-suborbicular with a cuneate base and an apex that can be truncate, rounded or acute, often red below, some 1.4 to 4 cm by 0.5 to 2 cm in size. The terminal or axillary inflorescences have solitary or pairs of flowers. Flowers have white to pink petals. Anthers are slender and have a long thin, curved upward tip, the style points downward. Septae disappear in young buds. The young berries are urceolate (urn/pitcher-shaped), but become globose, about 5mm in diameter, when immature they are green with a reddish rim, and become red on ripening. There are 5-10 cylindrical seeds some 2 to 2.5mm long (relatively large for the genus), with smooth testa cells.

The species is distinguished by the following characteristics: the terminal or axillary inflorescences with 1 or 2 flowers; the 5-10 cylindrical seeds about 2-2.5mm long; an anther appendage of a thick, dorsal, smooth margin spur; the size of the leaves (1.5-4 x 0.5-2 cm); adventitious roots which often have globose swellings; the flowers are mostly axillary, paired or solitary in simple cymes; the species often grows on ant plants.

The leaves of P. glauca subsp. glauca grow small, 1-nerved, elliptic to lanceolate leaves (only 2-4 by 0.5-2 cm) when growing on ant-plants, in the wild. However when grown under greenhouse conditions, the leaves are longer, broader, ovate and have 3 nerves. This is an example of the large phenotypic variation of leaves in the Pachycentria genus.

The autonym P. glauca subsp. glauca has elliptic-lanceolate leaves with an acute apex.

The maingayi subspecies has leaves that are obovate-suborbicular with a truncate or rounded apex. In Thailand flowering and fruiting occurs from April to October.

== Taxonomy ==
This species has two accepted subspecies:

- Pachycentria glauca subsp. glauca
- Pachycentria glauca subsp. maingayi (C.B.Clarke) Clausing

The species was named by the Colombian botanist José Jerónimo Triana (1828–90), who also produced medical products and how-to-read books. He published his description in an edition of Transactions of the Linnean Society of London produced in 1871 but published in 1872.

The maingayi subspecies was named in 2000 by the botanist Gudrun Clausing (born 1969) who was working at Johannes Gutenberg-Universität Mainz. The description was published in the journal Blumea. The subspecies was based on the previous taxa Medinilla maingayi, described by the English botanist Charles Baron Clarke (1832-1906) in 1879, in the publication The Flora of British India overseen by Joseph Dalton Hooker.

== Distribution ==
The autonym subspecies, P. glauca subsp. glauca is endemic to Borneo.

The maingayi subspecies is native, to Peninsular Malaysia. There is a single recording of it occurring on the adjacent north coast of Sumatera. In 2009, the subspecies was identified growing in the Sankalakhiri Range of extreme south Thailand.

== Habitat and ecology ==
The species is pollinated by bees, using buzz pollination, using vibrations to collect the pollen. One flower in an inflorescence opens per day, the open flower has stamens bent to one side of the flower, their tips arrange in close proximity with the style remaining either in the middle or pointing to the other side. The bee vibrates and pollen comes from the pores of the anthers. After pollination the petals reflex and stamens spread.

The fruit are dispersed by small to mid-sized birds and ants disperse seeds. The ants (Philidris and Crematogaster species and Camponotus (Myrmotarsus) irritabilis) take seeds from bird poo or from the ripe fruit. Seedlings are observed on ant plants and in ant gardens. Not only the seeds are attractive to ants, the plant grows pearl bodies as well.

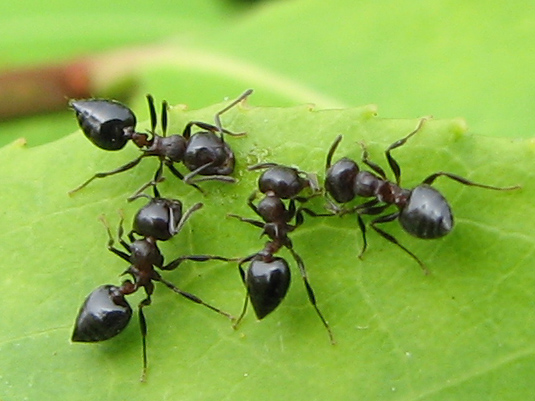
Cremagoster sp. ants

Subspecies glauca is found in kerangas, dry hill and old secondary forest from sea level to 1100m elevation. It grows as an epiphyte very frequently (perhaps exclusively) on ant plants, especially on other epiphytes such as Hydnophytum, Myrmecodia and Lecanopteris. The root swellings of the plant has been observed to be inhabited by ants.

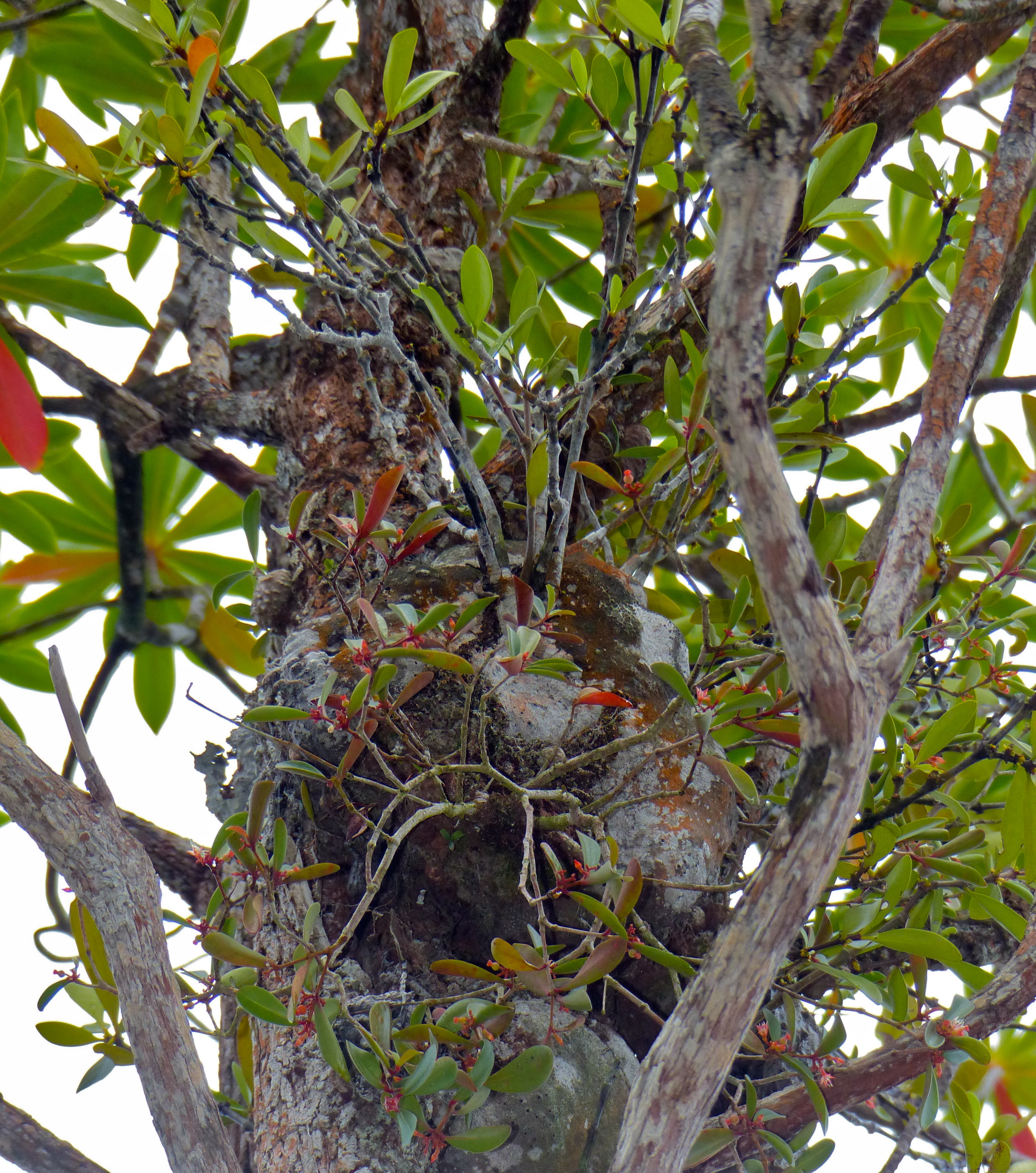
Hydnophytum sp., centre, epiphytically on tree

The maingayi subspecies is found in primary lowland, kerangas and heath forests at the same elevation ranges as its sibling subspecies. Also like it's sibling, it grows as an epiphyte, mostly on trees, also on other epiphytes and on ant plants, up to 40m in the air. Ants have been observed living in the root swellings. The Thai specimens identified were found growing on tree trunks and branches but also on rocks in partial shade on the quartzitic phyllite ridge, and in lowland evergreen forest, at elevations of 500-900m.
