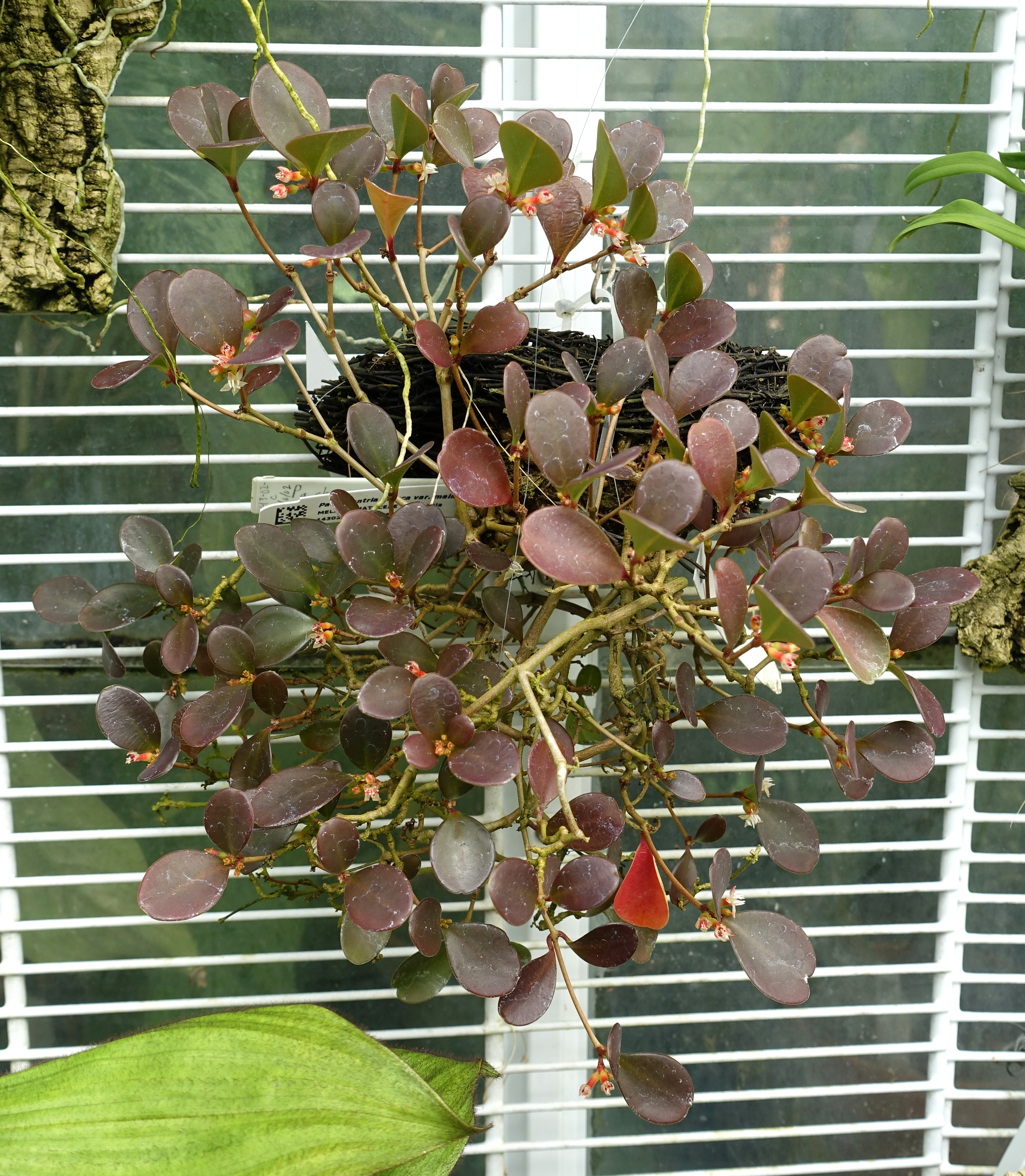
- Pachycentria glauca

Scientific classification
- Kingdom: Plantae
- Clade: Tracheophytes
- Clade: Angiosperms
- Clade: Eudicots
- Clade: Rosids
- Order: Myrtales
- Family: Melastomataceae
- Genus: Pachycentria; Blume

= Pachycentria =

Genus of shrubs

Pachycentria is a genus of epiphytic or terrestrial shrubs that grow up to 2.5 m tall, or rarely small trees up to 8 m tall, indigenous to Burma, Thailand, Peninsular Malaysia, Sumatra, Java, Borneo, Philippines, Sulawesi, and New Guinea.

Accepted species names, as of April 2021, include:

- Pachycentria constricta Blume
- Pachycentria glauca Triana
- Pachycentria hanseniana Clausing
- Pachycentria microsperma Becc.
- Pachycentria microstyla Becc.
- Pachycentria pulverulenta (Jack) Clausing
- Pachycentria varingaefolia Blume
- Pachycentria vogelkopensis Clausing
