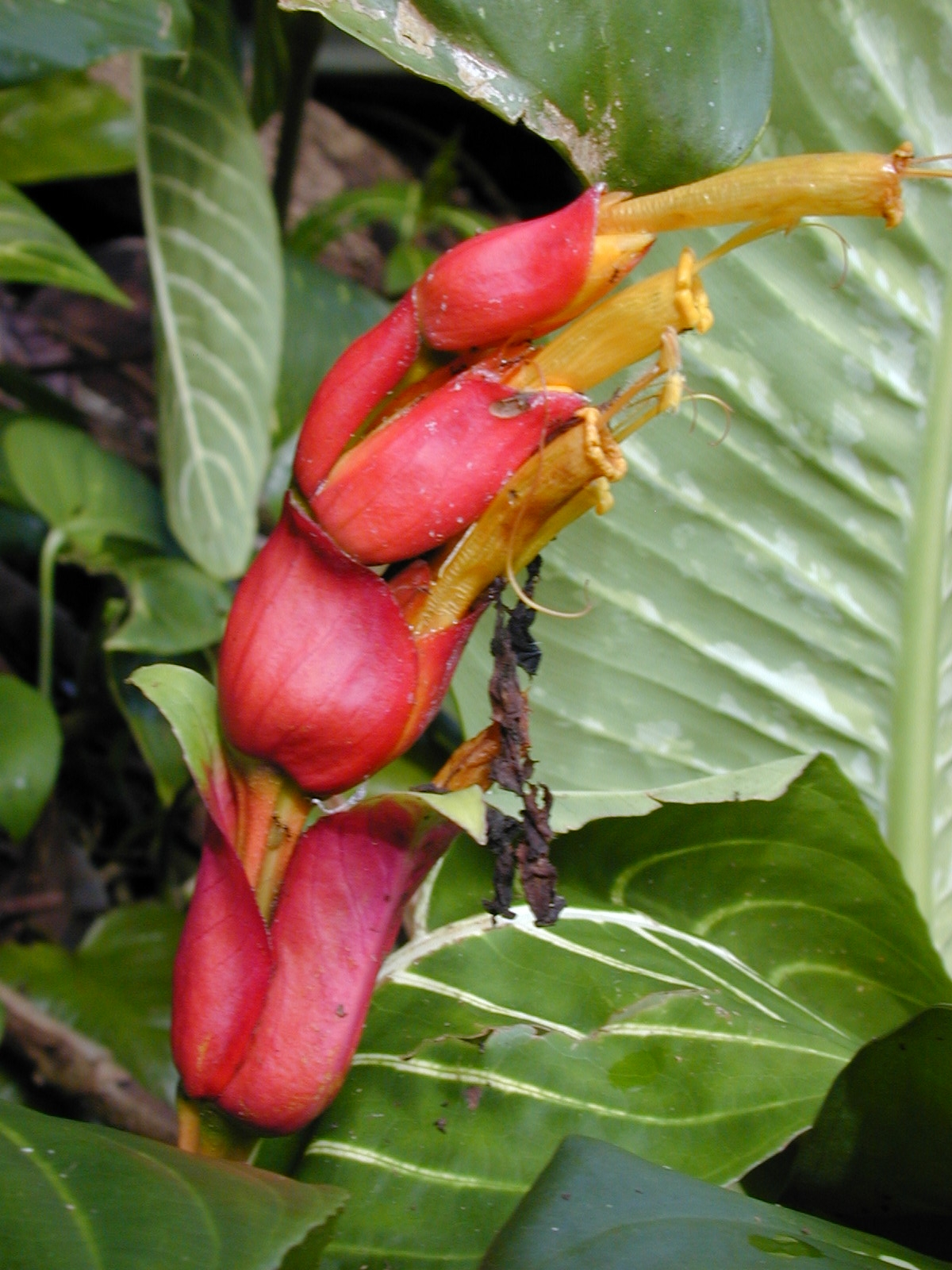
- Sanchezia speciosa inflorescence

Scientific classification
- Kingdom: Plantae
- Clade: Tracheophytes
- Clade: Angiosperms
- Clade: Eudicots
- Clade: Asterids
- Order: Lamiales
- Family: Acanthaceae
- Subfamily: Acanthoideae
- Tribe: Ruellieae
- Genus: Sanchezia; Ruiz & Pav.

Species
- 45, see text

Synonyms
- Ancylogyne Nees (1847); Steirosanchezia Lindau (1904)

= Sanchezia =

Genus of flowering plants

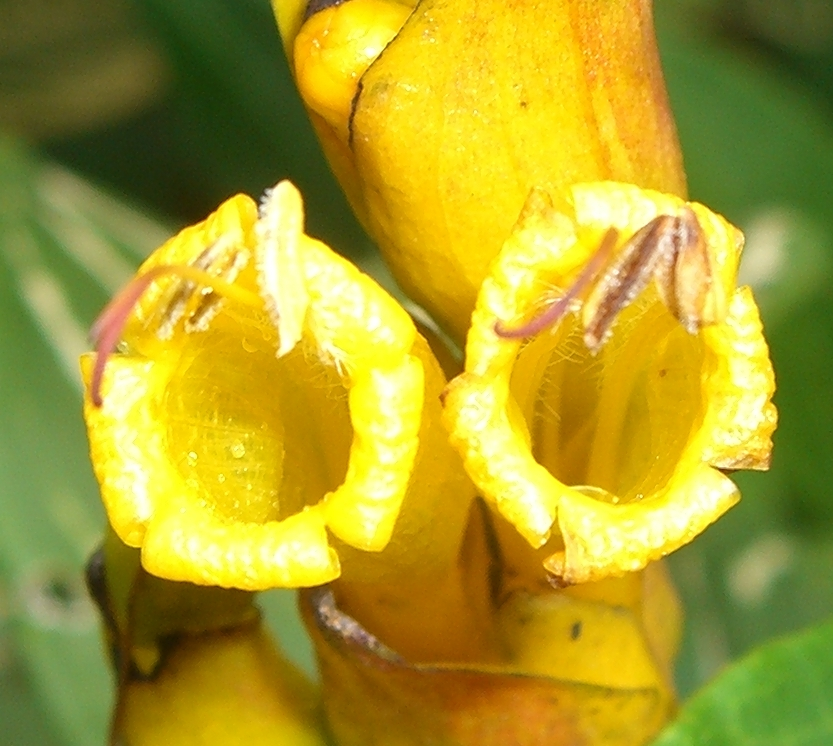
Closeup of two Sanchezia nobilis flowers

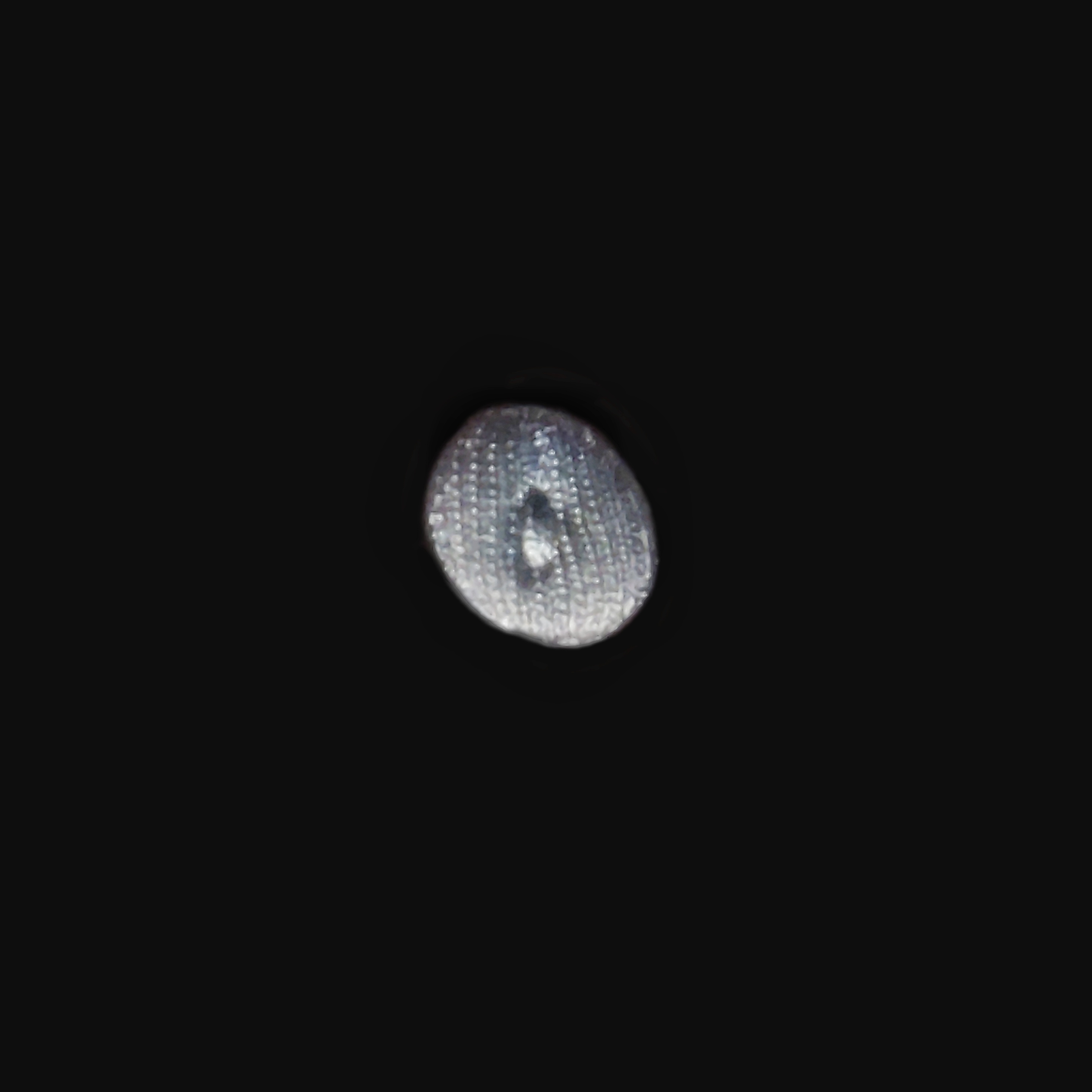
Pollen of Sanchezia sp

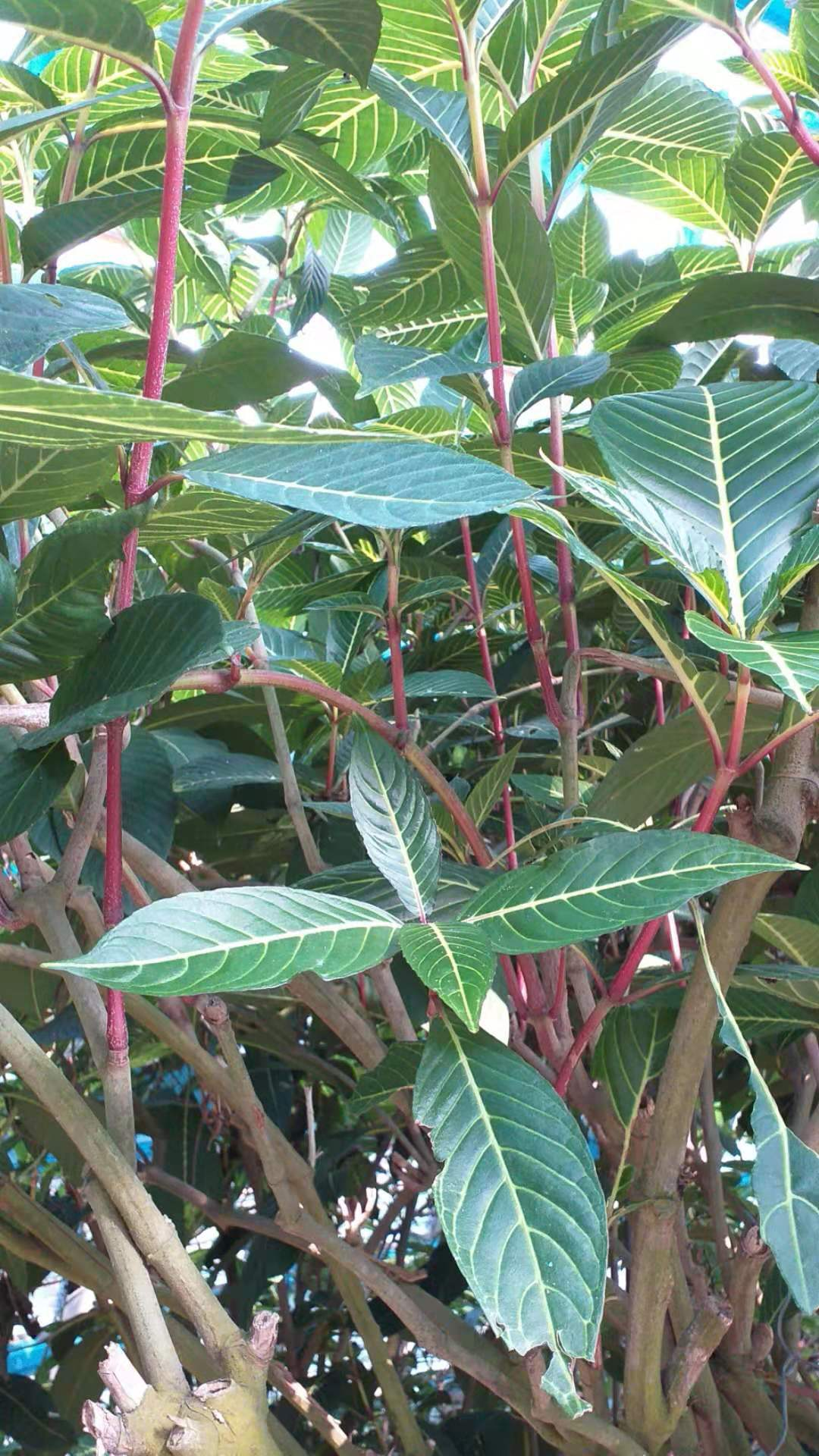
Red young branch of Sanchezia speciosa

Sanchezia is a genus of the plant family Acanthaceae. It contains 45 species. Members of this genus are shrubs, rarely small trees or herbs, occurring in the lowlands of tropical South and Central America. A close relative is Suessenguthia, which looks quite similar.

Because they have large, colorful bracts and flowers, and sometimes even colorful leaves, several species are cultivated as ornamental plants throughout the tropics and in botanical gardens of temperate areas. Examples for species well known from cultivation are S. nobilis, S. parvibracteata and S. speciosa. In some areas, ornamental species have become problematic as invasive weeds. On the other hand, S. lampra from Ecuador is almost extinct.

Sanchezia is named for José Sánchez, a nineteenth-century professor of botany at Cádiz, Spain.

== Species ==
45 species are accepted.

- Sanchezia aurantiaca Leonard & L.B.Sm.
- Sanchezia aurea Leonard & L.B.Sm.
- Sanchezia coccinea Leonard & L.B.Sm.
- Sanchezia coleifolia Leonard & L.B.Sm.
- Sanchezia conferta Leonard
- Sanchezia dasia Leonard & L.B.Sm.
- Sanchezia dubia I.H.F.Azevedo & P.L.R.Moraes
- Sanchezia ecuadorensis Leonard
- Sanchezia ferreyrae Leonard & L.B.Sm.
- Sanchezia filamentosa Lindau
- Sanchezia fosteri Wassh.
- Sanchezia killipii Leonard
- Sanchezia klugii Leonard & L.B.Sm.
- Sanchezia lampra Leonard & L.B.Sm.
- Sanchezia lasia Leonard & L.B.Sm.
- Sanchezia lispa Leonard & L.B.Sm.
- Sanchezia longiflora (Hook.f.) Hook.f. ex Planch.
- Sanchezia loranthifolia Lindau
- Sanchezia macrocnemis (Nees) Wassh.
- Sanchezia munita (Nees) Planch.
- Sanchezia oblonga Ruiz & Pav.
- Sanchezia ovata Ruiz & Pav.
- Sanchezia parvibracteata Sprague & Hutch.
- Sanchezia parviflora Leonard
- Sanchezia pedicellata Leonard & L.B.Sm.
- Sanchezia pulchra Leonard
- Sanchezia punicea Leonard & L.B.Sm.
- Sanchezia putumayensis Leonard
- Sanchezia rhodochroa Leonard & L.B.Sm.
- Sanchezia rosea Leonard
- Sanchezia rubriflora Leonard
- Sanchezia sanmartinensis Leonard & L.B.Sm.
- Sanchezia scandens (Lindau) Leonard & L.B.Sm.
- Sanchezia sericea Leonard
- Sanchezia siraensis Wassh.
- Sanchezia sprucei Lindau
- Sanchezia sylvestris Leonard
- Sanchezia tarapotensis Leonard & L.B.Sm.
- Sanchezia thinophila Leonard
- Sanchezia tigrina Leonard
- Sanchezia villosa Leonard & L.B.Sm.
- Sanchezia williamsii Leonard
- Sanchezia woytkowskii Leonard & L.B.Sm.
- Sanchezia wurdackii Wassh.
- Sanchezia xantha Leonard & L.B.Sm.

== Bibliography ==
- Clay, Horace F.; Hubbard, James C. & Golt, Rick (1987): Tropical Shrubs. University of Hawaii Press. ISBN 0-8248-1128-3
- Leonard, E.C. & Smith, L.B. (1964): Sanchezia and related American Acanthaceae. Rhodora 66: 313-343.
