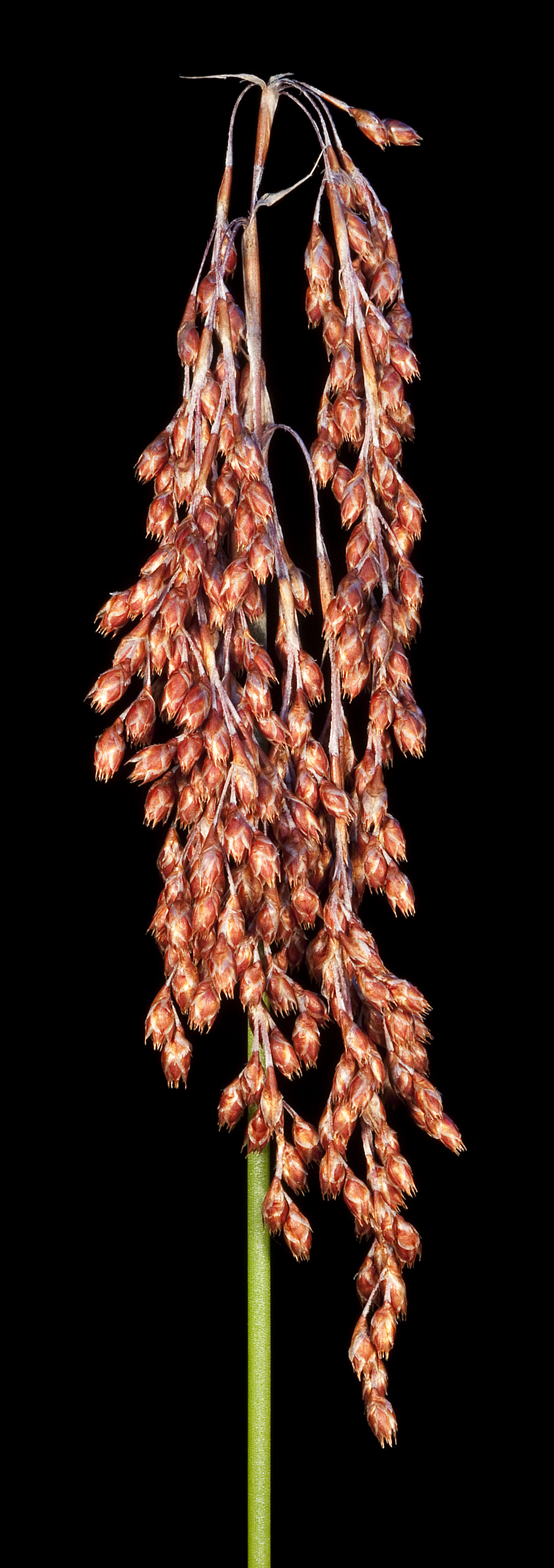

Scientific classification
- Kingdom: Plantae
- Clade: Tracheophytes
- Clade: Angiosperms
- Clade: Monocots
- Clade: Commelinids
- Order: Poales
- Family: Restionaceae
- Genus: Leptocarpus
- Species: L. laxus

Binomial name
- Leptocarpus laxus (R.Br.) B.G.Briggs

Synonyms
- Leptocarpus diffusus (Spreng.) B.G.Briggs & L.A.S.Johnson; Restio diffusus Spreng.

= Leptocarpus laxus =

Species of flowering plant

Leptocarpus laxus is a rush species of the genus Leptocarpus in the family Restionaceae. It is endemic to the south-west of Western Australia.

== Habitat ==
It grows in moist to wet soils, in swamps, creeks, seasonally wet sites, and near road ditches.

== Taxonomy ==
It was first described by Robert Brown in 1810 as Restio laxus, a name he gave to two Restio species. This problem of two species with the same name was corrected by Kurt Sprengel in 1825 when he published the name, Restio diffusus, for this species. In 1998, Lawrie Johnson and Barbara Briggs transferred R. diffusus to the genus, Leptocarpus. In 2001 in consideration of IUCN rules, the species Leptocarpus diffusus was renamed Leptocarpus laxus by Barbara Briggs.
