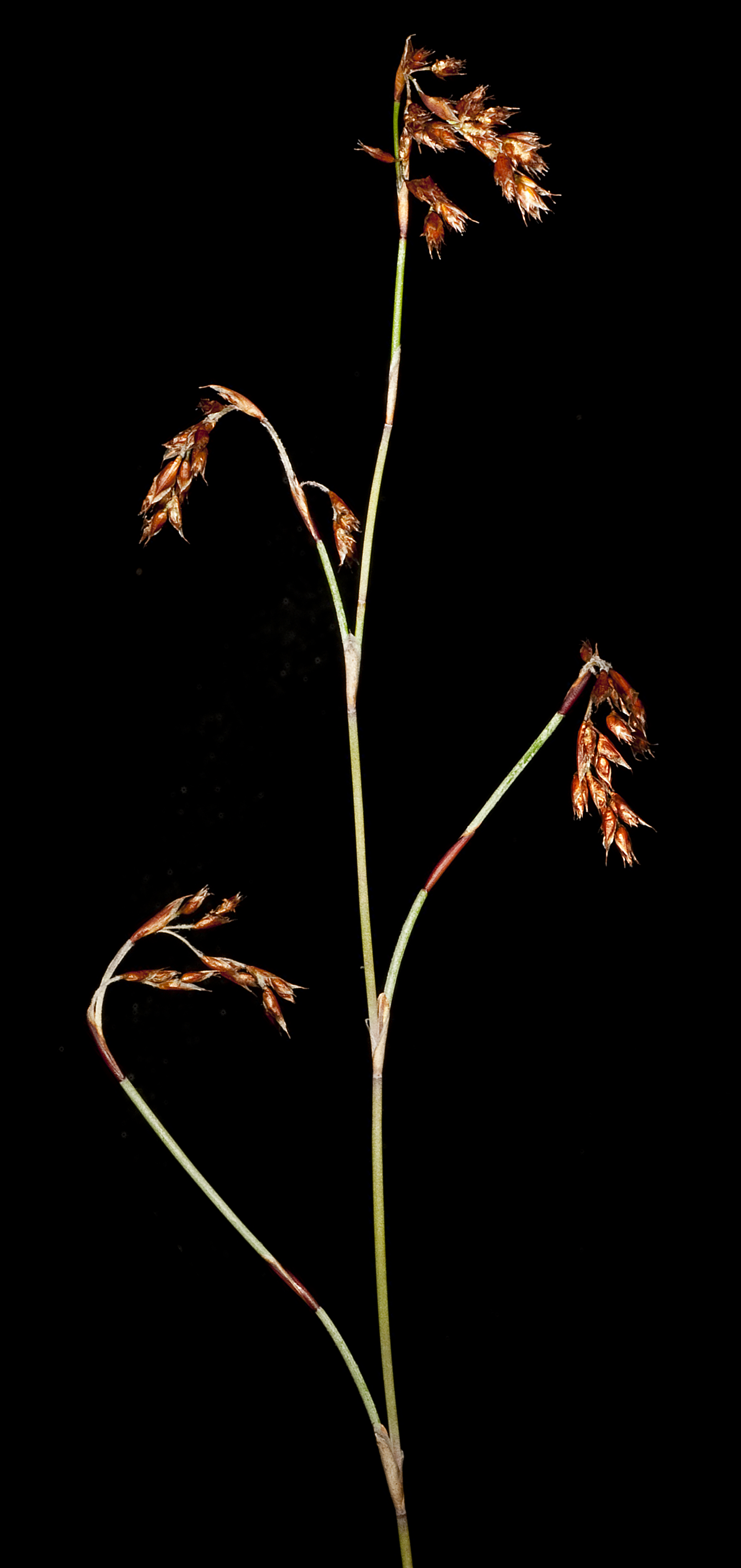

Scientific classification
- Kingdom: Plantae
- Clade: Tracheophytes
- Clade: Angiosperms
- Clade: Monocots
- Clade: Commelinids
- Order: Poales
- Family: Restionaceae
- Genus: Leptocarpus
- Species: L. coangustatus

Binomial name
- Leptocarpus coangustatus Nees

Synonyms
- Meeboldina coangustata (Nees) B.G.Briggs & L.A.S.Johnson

= Leptocarpus coangustatus =

Species of plant

Leptocarpus coangustatus is a species of plant in the Restionaceae (rush) family, endemic to Western Australia.

It was first described by Christian Gottfried Daniel Nees von Esenbeck in 1846, from plants collected by J.A.L. Preiss (in the Darling Ranges) and James Drummond (on the Swan River). In 1998 Barbara Briggs and Lawrie Johnson transferred the species to the genus, Meeboldina, to give the species name, Meeboldina coangustata. However in 2014, the genus Leptocarpus was expanded to include Meeboldina and by 2021 the later name was no longer accepted.
