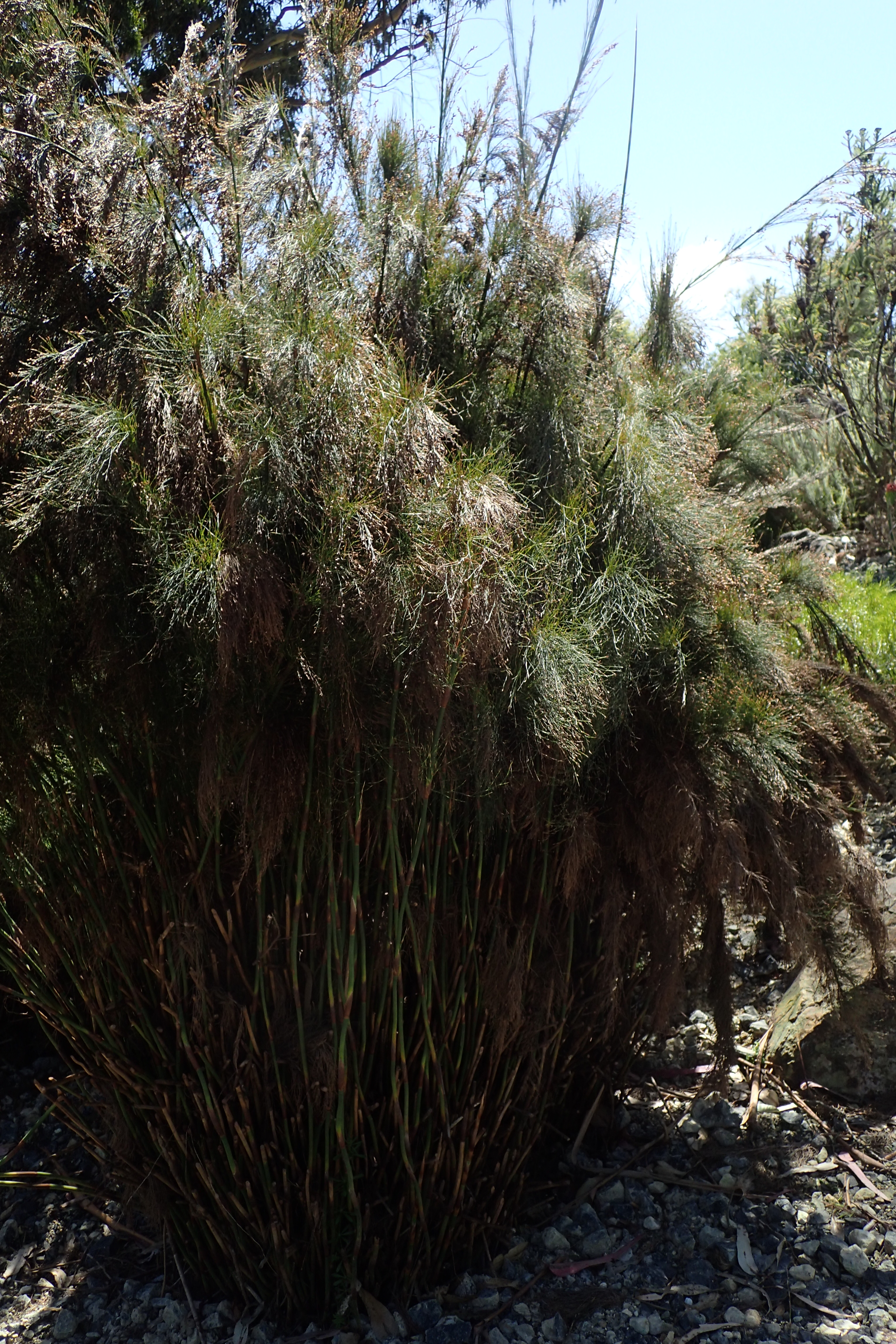
- Habit

Scientific classification
- Kingdom: Plantae
- Clade: Embryophytes
- Clade: Tracheophytes
- Clade: Angiosperms
- Clade: Monocots
- Clade: Commelinids
- Order: Poales
- Family: Restionaceae
- Genus: Rhodocoma
- Species: R. capensis

Binomial name
- Rhodocoma capensis Nees ex Steud.

Synonyms
- Restio rhodocoma Mast.; Rhodocoma equisetum Nees ex Mast.

= Rhodocoma capensis =

Species of plant

Rhodocoma capensis, called the Cape restio, is a species of reed-like perennial grass in the family Restionaceae, native to the southwestern Cape Provinces of South Africa. Growing over 2 m (6 ft 7 in) tall, with clumping, jointed stems, it has gained the Royal Horticultural Society's Award of Garden Merit as an ornamental, suitable for borders and architectural applications.
