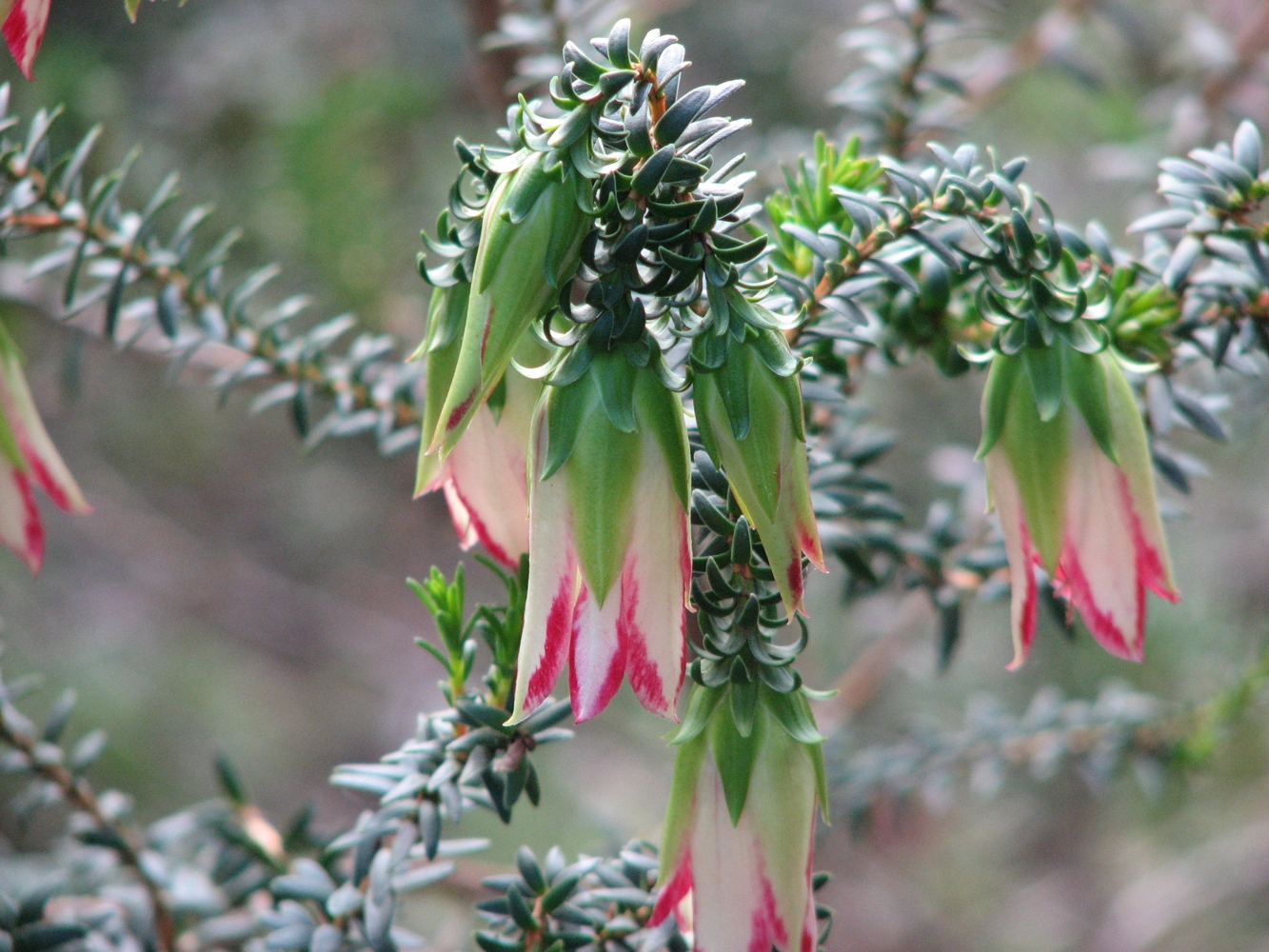

Conservation status
- Vulnerable (EPBC Act)

Scientific classification
- Kingdom: Plantae
- Clade: Tracheophytes
- Clade: Angiosperms
- Clade: Eudicots
- Clade: Rosids
- Order: Myrtales
- Family: Myrtaceae
- Genus: Darwinia
- Species: D. meeboldii

Binomial name
- Darwinia meeboldii C.A.Gardner
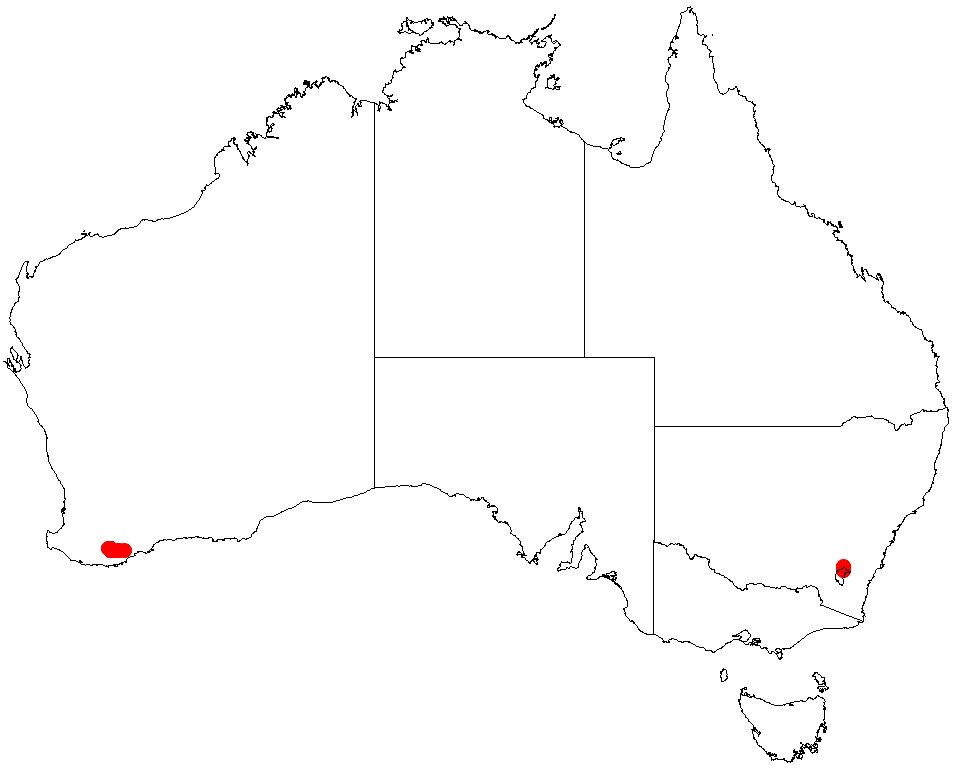
- Occurrence data from AVH

= Darwinia meeboldii =

Species of flowering plant

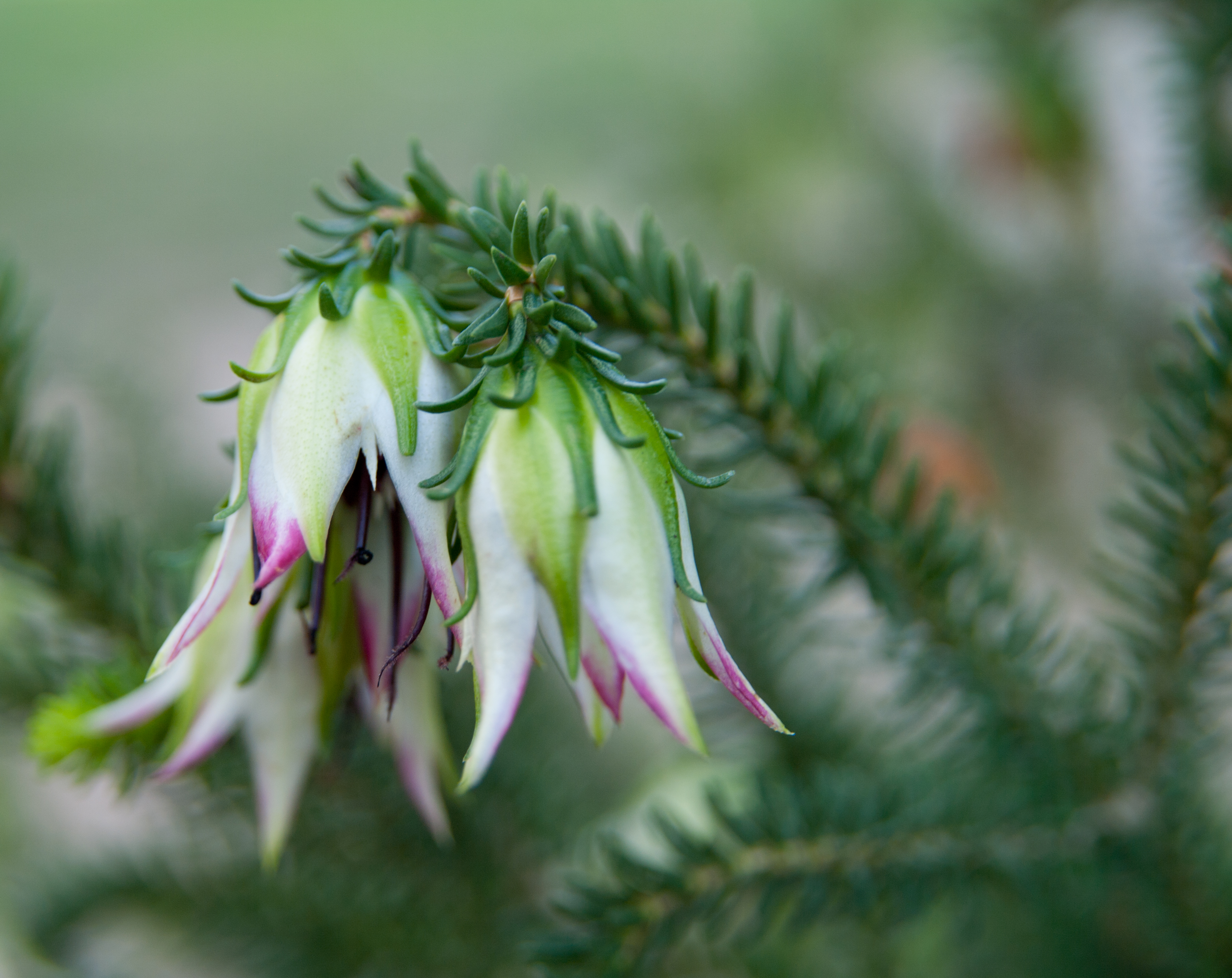

Darwinia meeboldii, commonly known as Cranbrook bell, is a species of flowering plant in the family Myrtaceae and is endemic to the south-west of Western Australia. It is an erect, spindly shrub with crowded leaves and clusters of pendent flowers surrounded by large bracts.

== Description ==
Darwinia meeboldii is an erect, spindly shrub that typically grows to a height of 0.5–3 m (1 ft 8 in – 9 ft 10 in). It has erect, crowded leaves up to about 10 mm (0.39 in) long and 2 mm (0.079 in) wide. The flowers are small and pendent, arranged in groups of 8 surrounded by relatively large red, white and green bracts. Flowering occurs between August and November.

== Taxonomy ==
Darwinia meeboldii was first formally described in 1943 by Charles Gardner in the Journal of the Royal Society of Western Australia. The specific epithet (meeboldii) honours Alfred Meebold.

== Distribution and habitat ==
Cranbrook bell occurs on peaty soils on slopes in the western part of the Stirling Range National Park.

== Conservation status ==
Darwinia meeboldii is listed as "vulnerable" under the Australian Government Environment Protection and Biodiversity Conservation Act 1999 and as "Threatened" by the Western Australian Government Department of Biodiversity, Conservation and Attractions, meaning that it is in danger of extinction. The main threats to the species include its restricted distribution, loss of canopy cover, weed invasion and grazing by rabbits.

== Use in horticulture ==
The species requires good drainage and protection from direct sun. It is difficult to propagate from seed, but cuttings strike readily. Grafting on stocks of Darwinia citriodora may be carried out in areas with unsuitable growing conditions including high humidity.
