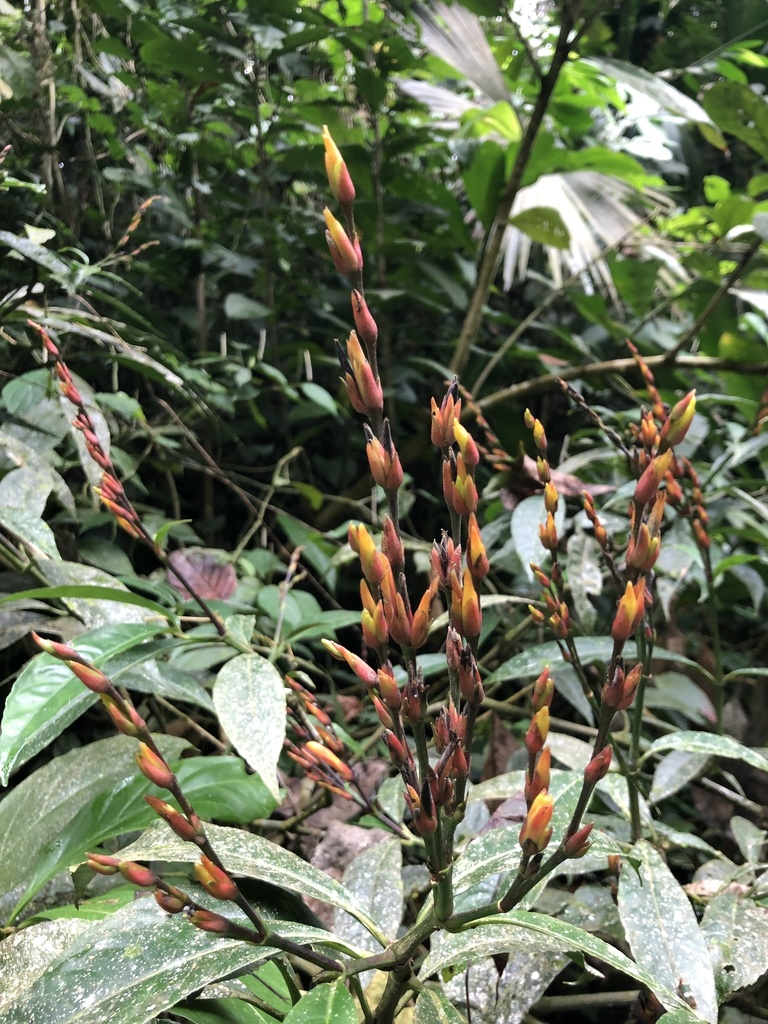

Conservation status
- Least Concern (IUCN 3.1)

Scientific classification
- Kingdom: Plantae
- Clade: Tracheophytes
- Clade: Angiosperms
- Clade: Eudicots
- Clade: Asterids
- Order: Lamiales
- Family: Acanthaceae
- Genus: Sanchezia
- Species: S. parviflora

Binomial name
- Sanchezia parviflora Leonard

= Sanchezia parviflora =

Species of flowering plant

Sanchezia parviflora is a species of plant in the family Acanthaceae. It is endemic to Ecuador. Its natural habitats are subtropical or tropical moist lowland forests and subtropical or tropical moist montane forests. It is threatened by habitat loss.

== Distribution ==
Sanchezia parviflora are widely distributed and known from 13 subpopulations in Costa, Sierra, and Oriente regions. It is a strub of piemontano coastal and amazonian forest that is found at an elevational of 0–1,500 meters.

== Threats ==
Aside from habitat destruction, there are no threats known to this plant.
