= Meeboldia =

Scientific classification
- Kingdom: Plantae
- Clade: Tracheophytes
- Clade: Angiosperms
- Clade: Eudicots
- Clade: Asterids
- Order: Apiales
- Family: Apiaceae
- Subfamily: Apioideae
- Genus: Meeboldia; H.Wolff

Synonyms
- Sinodielsia H.Wolff

Genus of flowering plant

Meeboldia is a genus of flowering plants belonging to the family Apiaceae.

Its native range is Nepal, East Himalaya, West Himalaya, Tibet, to south-central China.

The genus name of Meeboldia is in honour of Alfred Meebold (1863–1952), a German botanist, writer, and anthroposophist. It was first described and published in Repert. Spec. Nov. Regni Veg. Vol.19 on page 313 in 1924.

== Species ==
According to Kew:

- Meeboldia achilleifolia (DC.) P.K.Mukh. & Constance
- Meeboldia yunnanensis (H.Wolff) Constance & F.T.Pu ex S.L.Liou
