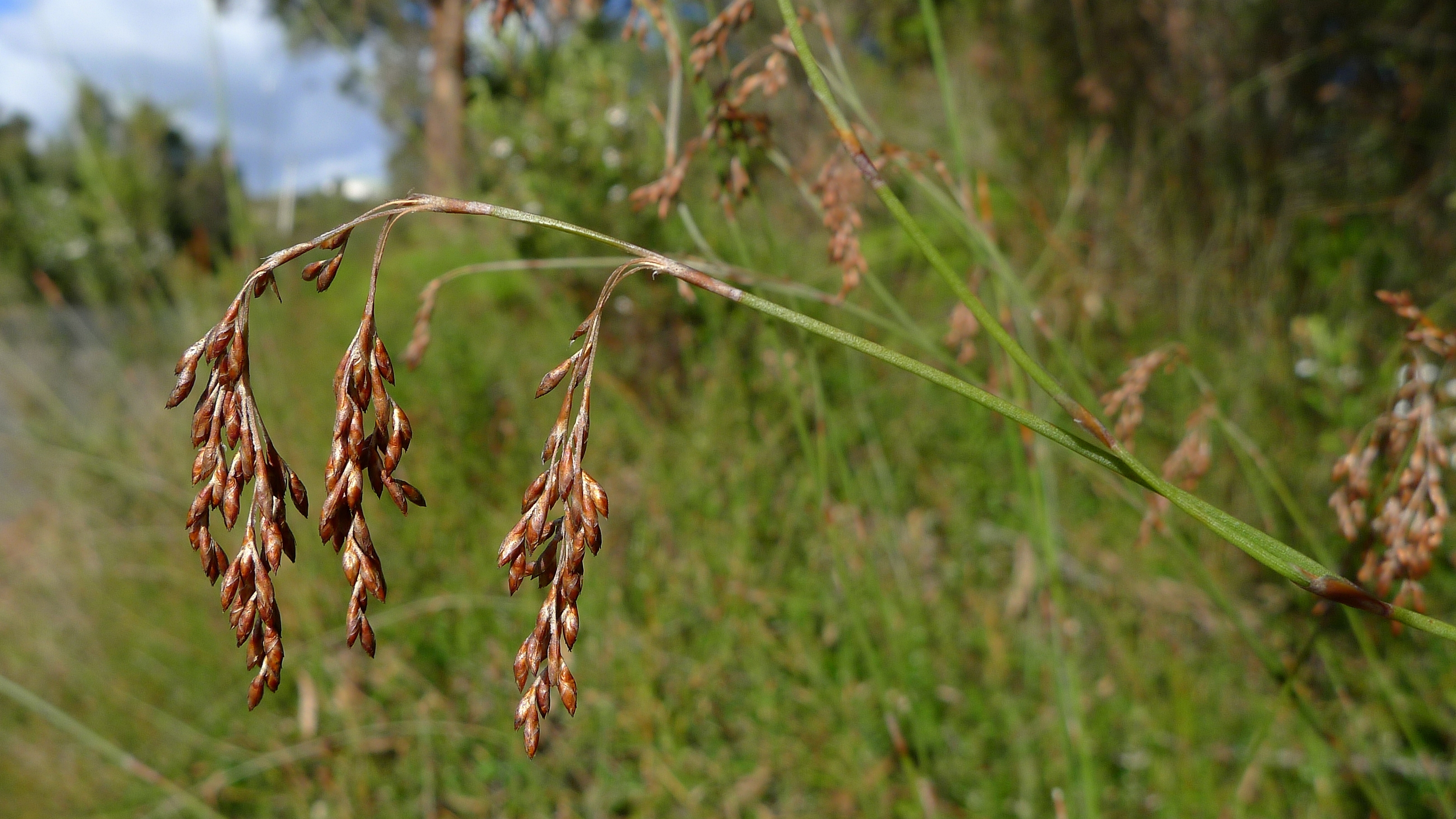

Scientific classification
- Kingdom: Plantae
- Clade: Embryophytes
- Clade: Tracheophytes
- Clade: Spermatophytes
- Clade: Angiosperms
- Clade: Monocots
- Clade: Commelinids
- Order: Poales
- Family: Restionaceae
- Genus: Leptocarpus
- Species: L. tenax

Binomial name
- Leptocarpus tenax (R.Br.) Labill.

= Leptocarpus tenax =

Species of flowering plant

Leptocarpus tenax is a species of plant in the family Restionaceae. It is perennial, dioecious herb found in many moist parts of eastern and southern Australia and often seen growing from 50 to 130 cm tall, with stems 1 to 2 mm in diameter. The specific epithet tenax is derived from Latin, meaning "holding fast".
