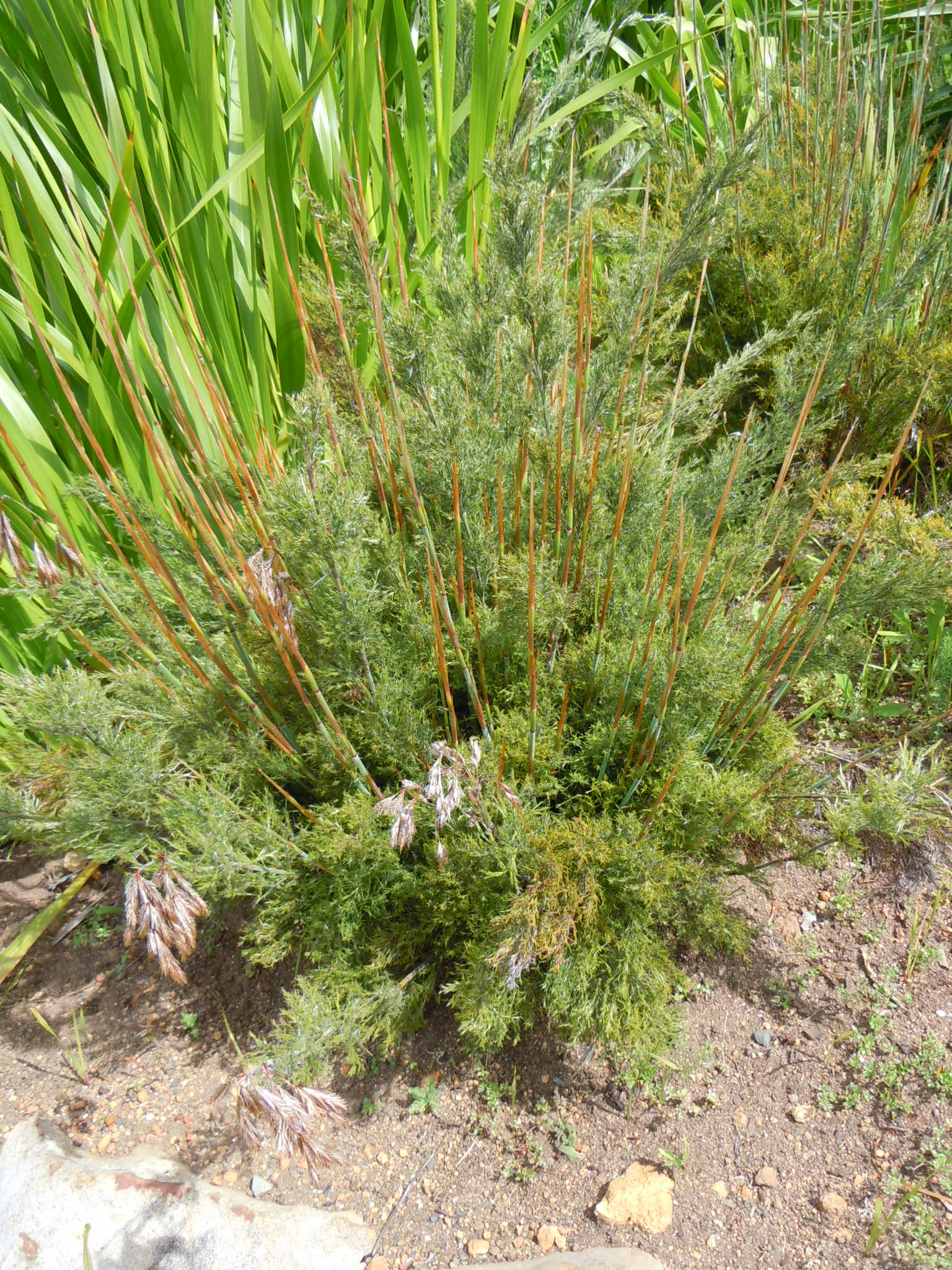
- A specimen cultivated at Kirstenbosch, Cape Town, South Africa

Scientific classification
- Kingdom: Plantae
- Clade: Tracheophytes
- Clade: Angiosperms
- Clade: Monocots
- Clade: Commelinids
- Order: Poales
- Family: Restionaceae
- Genus: Thamnochortus
- Species: T. cinereus

Binomial name
- Thamnochortus cinereus H.P.Linder

= Thamnochortus cinereus =

Species of grass

Thamnochortus cinereus is a species of grass-like restio of the family Restionaceae. It grows in the fynbos region in South Africa. It is known as the silver reed in English and Silverriet in Afrikaans.

== Description ==
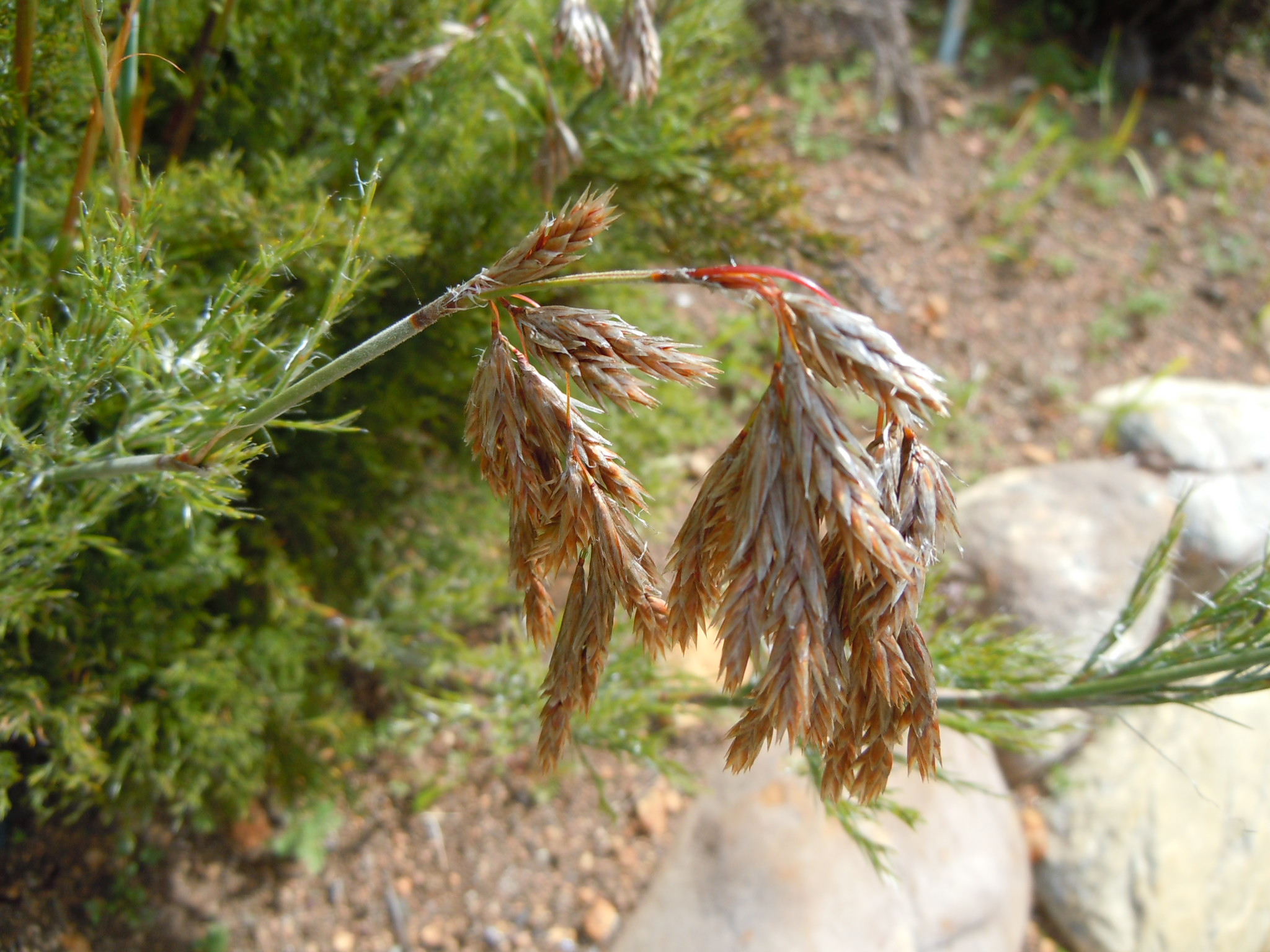
Detail of flowering head

This is a 'tufted' restio, somewhat rush-like in appearance; it looks like a miniature version of larger restio species such as Elegia capensis.
