= Karl Suessenguth =

German botanist and university teacher (1893–1955)

Karl Suessenguth (22 June 1893 in Münnerstadt – 7 April 1955 in Ischia) was a German botanist.

He studied under Karl Ritter von Goebel at the Ludwig-Maximilians-Universität München, where in 1927 he became a professor of botany. From 1927 to 1955 he was curator of the Botanische Staatssammlung München. The standard author abbreviation Suess. is used to indicate this person as the author when citing a botanical name.

As a taxonomist, he classified many plants within the family Amaranthaceae. The botanical genera Suessenguthia (family Acanthaceae) and Suessenguthiella (family Molluginaceae) commemorate his name.

== Written works ==
He was an editor of the multi-volume Illustrierte Flora von Mittel-Europa (Illustrated Flora of Central Europe) and the author of the following works:

- "Amarantaceae of southeastern Polynesia" (in English) Honolulu, Hawaii, The Museum, 1936.
- Neue Ziele der Botanik, 1938 – New objectives of botany.
- Ueber einige amerikanische "Amarantaceae" und "Rhamnaceae", 1939 – On American Amarantaceae und Rhamnaceae.
- Mitteilungen Der Botanischen Staatssammlung München (as editor) – Journal of the Botanische Staatssammlung München.
