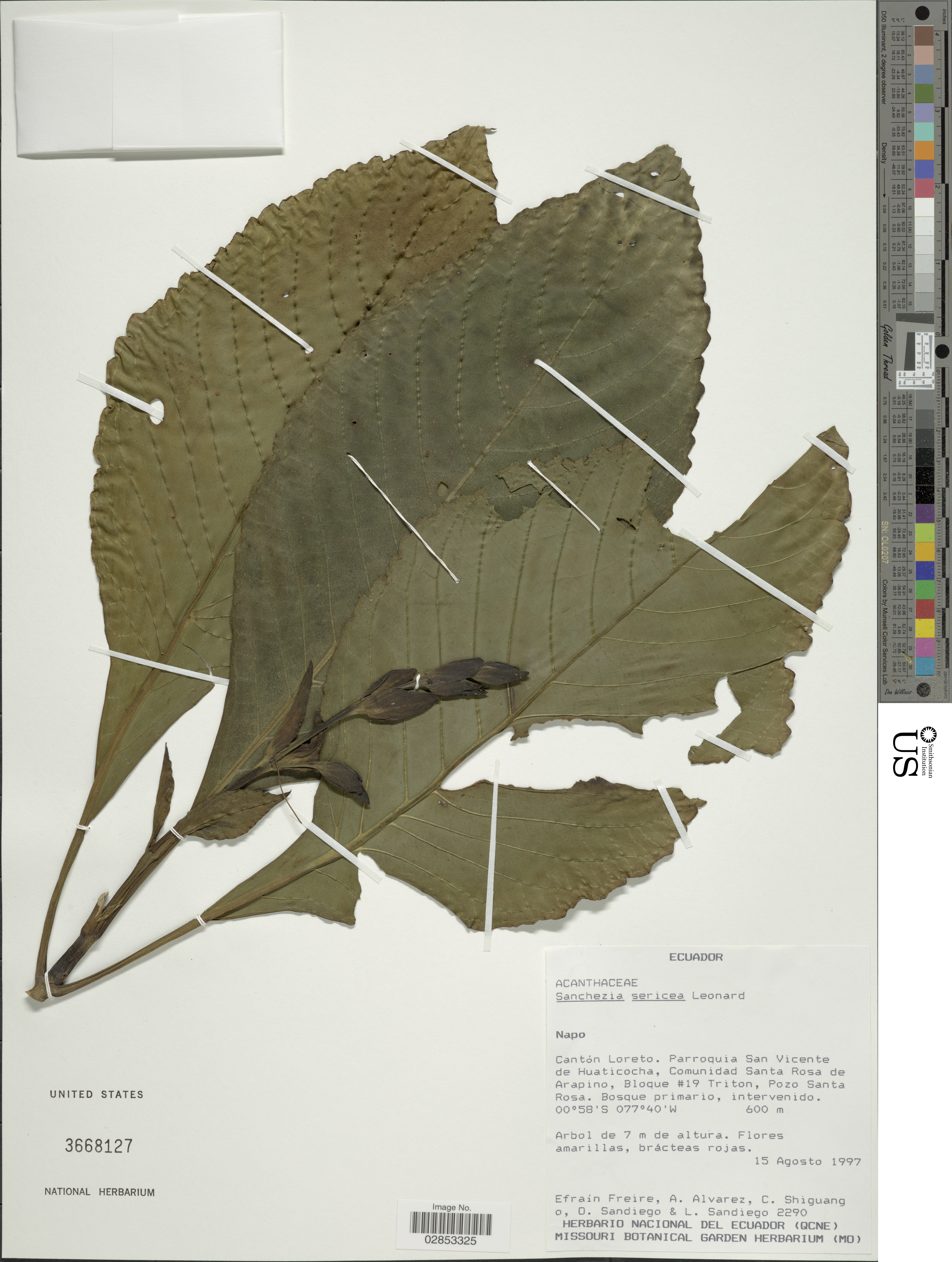

Conservation status
- Least Concern (IUCN 3.1)

Scientific classification
- Kingdom: Plantae
- Clade: Tracheophytes
- Clade: Angiosperms
- Clade: Eudicots
- Clade: Asterids
- Order: Lamiales
- Family: Acanthaceae
- Genus: Sanchezia
- Species: S. sericea

Binomial name
- Sanchezia sericea Leonard

= Sanchezia sericea =

Species of flowering plant

Sanchezia sericea is a species of plant in the family Acanthaceae. It is endemic to Ecuador. Its natural habitats are subtropical or tropical moist lowland forests and subtropical or tropical moist montane forests. It is threatened by habitat loss.
