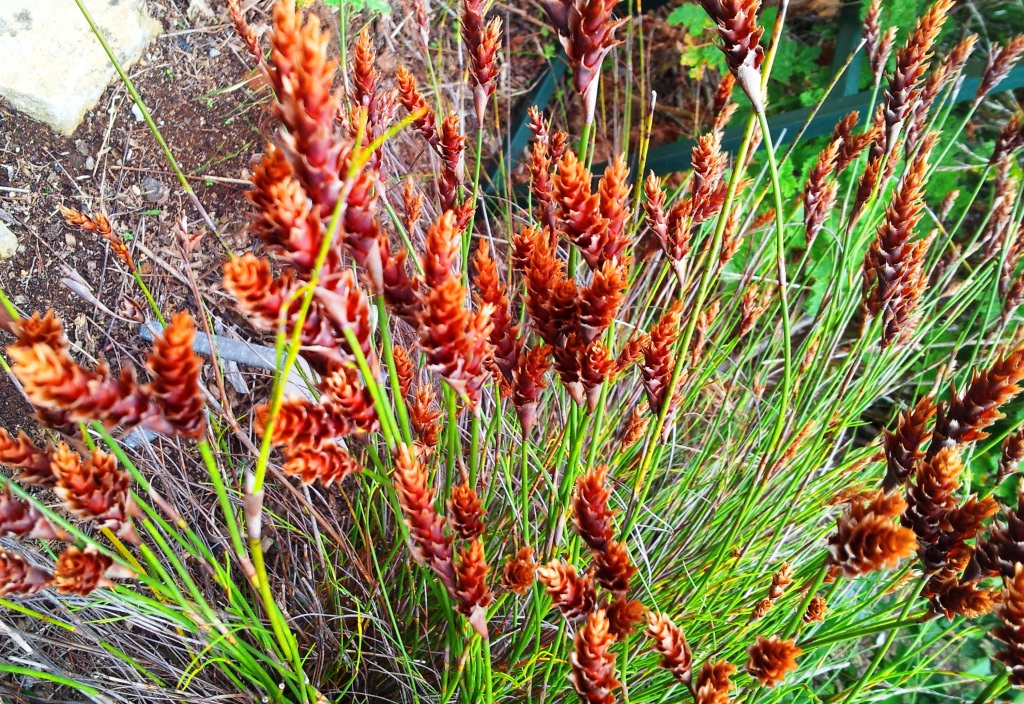
- Staberoha banksii

Scientific classification
- Kingdom: Plantae
- Clade: Tracheophytes
- Clade: Angiosperms
- Clade: Monocots
- Clade: Commelinids
- Order: Poales
- Family: Restionaceae
- Genus: Staberoha; Kunth

Type species
- Staberoha distachyos (Rottb.) Kunth

= Staberoha =

Genus of plants

Staberoha is a group of plants in the Restionaceae described as a genus in 1841. The entire genus is endemic to the Cape Provinces in South Africa.

== Species ==
Nine species are accepted.

- Staberoha aemula (Kunth) Pillans
- Staberoha banksii Pillans
- Staberoha cernua (L.f.) T.Durand & Schinz
- Staberoha distachyos (Rottb.) Kunth
- Staberoha multispicula Pillans
- Staberoha ornata Esterh.
- Staberoha remota Pillans
- Staberoha stokoei Pillans
- Staberoha vaginata (Thunb.) Pillans

Formerly included

moved to other genera – Restio and Thamnochortus

- Staberoha caricina - Thamnochortus erectus
- Staberoha disticha - Restio distichus
- Staberoha gracilis - Thamnochortus gracilis
