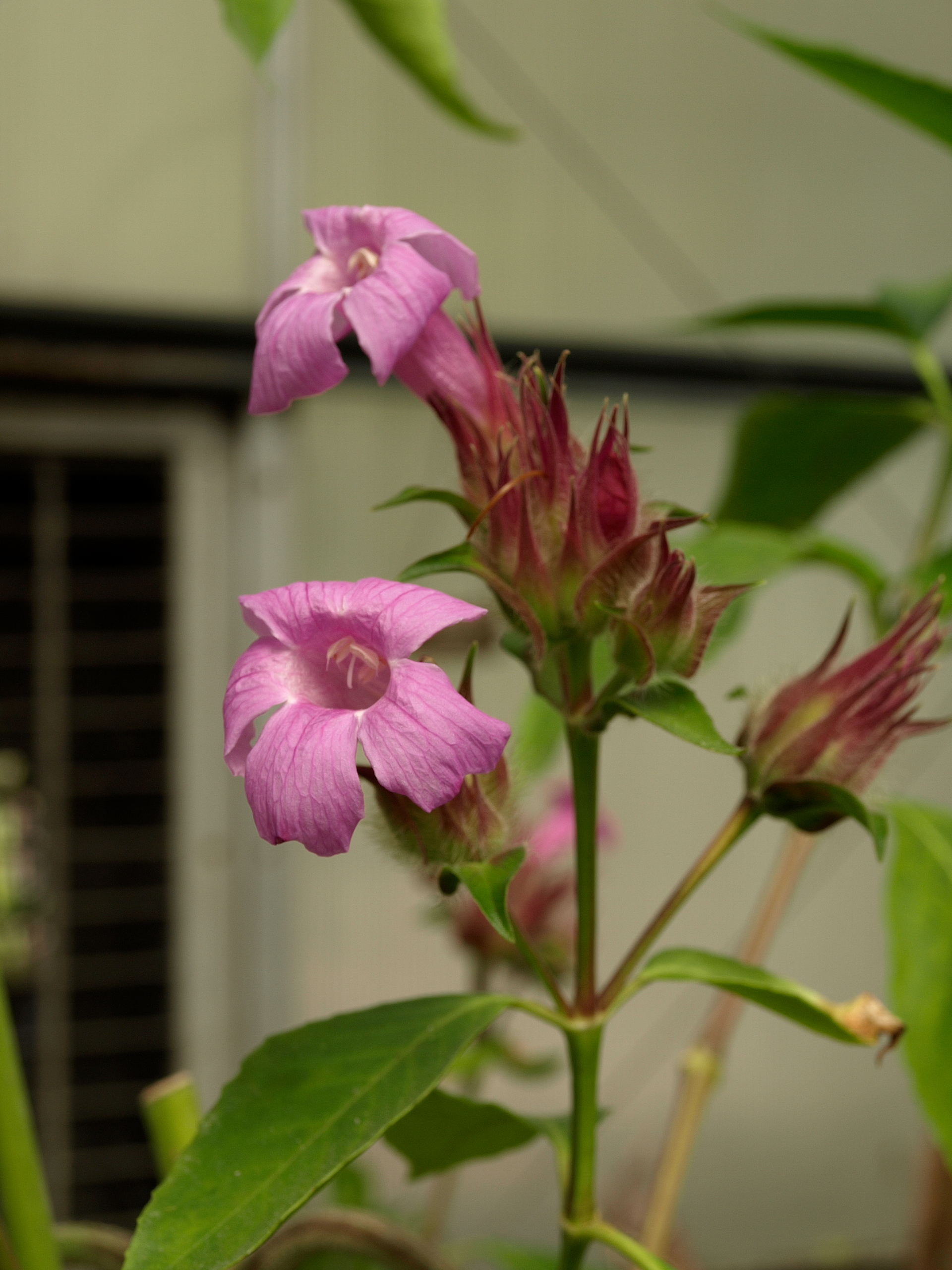
- Suessenguthia trochilophila

Scientific classification
- Kingdom: Plantae
- Clade: Tracheophytes
- Clade: Angiosperms
- Clade: Eudicots
- Clade: Asterids
- Order: Lamiales
- Family: Acanthaceae
- Subfamily: Acanthoideae
- Tribe: Ruellieae
- Genus: Suessenguthia; Merxm. (1953)

Species
- 8, see text

= Suessenguthia =

Family of shrubs

Suessenguthia is a genus of the Acanthaceae plant family comprising eight species of shrubs with showy, tubular flowers arranged in few-flowered heads. It occurs in the lowlands and Andean foothills of southern Peru, Bolivia, and the Brazilian state of Acre, often growing in small groups along rivers.

Suessenguthia is similar to and closely related to the better known and larger genus Sanchezia.

Suessenguthia multisetosa from eastern Bolivia is one of the more known species as it is cultivated for ornamental use.

== Species ==
Eight species are accepted:

- Suessenguthia barthleniana Schmidt-Leb.
- Suessenguthia cuscoensis Wassh.
- Suessenguthia koessleri Schmidt-Leb.
- Suessenguthia multisetosa (Rusby) Wassh. & J.R.I.Wood ex Schmidt-Lebuhn
- Suessenguthia trochilophila Merxm.
- Suessenguthia vargasii Wassh.
- Suessenguthia wallnoeferi Wassh.
- Suessenguthia wenzelii Schmidt-Leb.
