= Gudrun Kadereit =

German botanist

- Born: Gudrun Clausing; 1969 (age 56–57)
- Known for: Princess Therese von Bayern Chair of Systematics, Biodiversity and Evolution of Plants at LMU Munich and director of Botanische Staatssammlung München
- Scientific career
- Institutions: Botanische Staatssammlung München (2021– ) LMU Munich

Gudrun Kadereit (born 1969) is a German botanist, the Princess Therese von Bayern Chair of Systematics, Biodiversity and Evolution of Plants at LMU Munich and the director of both the Botanical Garden Munich-Nymphenburg and the Botanical State Collection Munich.

Her research focuses on angiosperm phylogenetics, systematics and biogeography, in particular on the families Amaranthaceae, Melastomataceae, Crassulaceae, Aizoaceae and Zygophyllaceae but also on the evolution of C4 photosynthesis and Crassulacean Acid Metabolism (CAM) and the evolution of seed traits.
