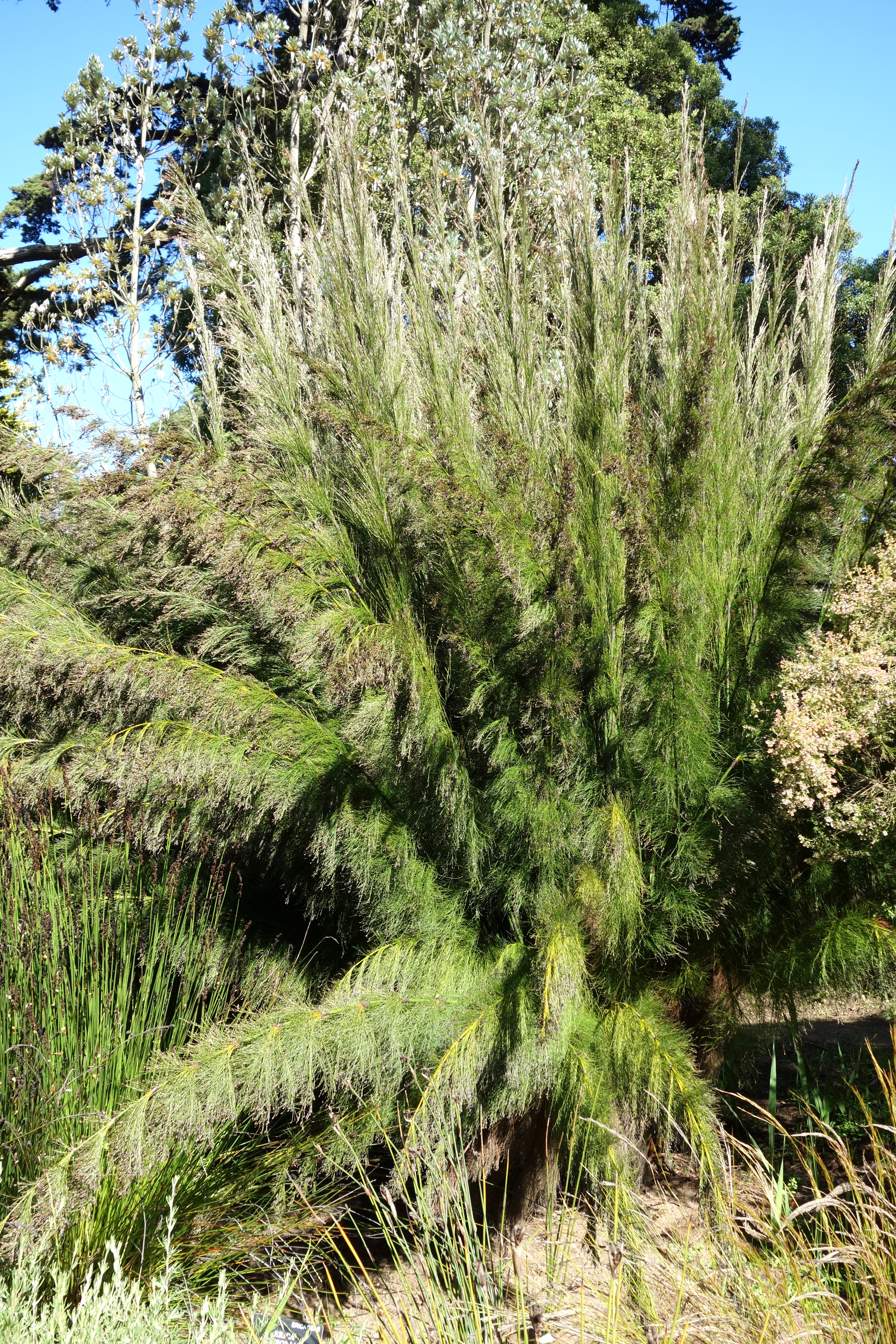
- Rhodocoma capensis

Scientific classification
- Kingdom: Plantae
- Clade: Tracheophytes
- Clade: Angiosperms
- Clade: Monocots
- Clade: Commelinids
- Order: Poales
- Family: Restionaceae
- Genus: Rhodocoma; Nees

Type species
- Rhodocoma capensis Nees ex Steud.

= Rhodocoma =

Genus of plants

Rhodocoma is a group of plants in the Restionaceae described as a genus in 1836. The entire genus is endemic to the Cape Provinces and KwaZulu-Natal in South Africa.

== Species ==
Eight species are accepted.

- Rhodocoma alpina H.P.Linder & Vlok
- Rhodocoma arida H.P.Linder & Vlok
- Rhodocoma capensis Nees ex Steud.
- Rhodocoma foliosa (N.E.Br.) H.P.Linder & C.R.Hardy
- Rhodocoma fruticosa (Thunb.) H.P.Linder
- Rhodocoma gigantea (Kunth) H.P.Linder
- Rhodocoma gracilis H.P.Linder & Vlok
- Rhodocoma vleibergensis H.P.Linder
