= Botanische Staatssammlung München =

Herbarium in Munich, Germany

- Location: 48.1642°N 11.5007°E

The Botanische Staatssammlung München is a notable herbarium and scientific center maintained by the Staatliche Naturwissenschaftliche Sammlungen Bayerns. Its building is located within the Botanischer Garten München-Nymphenburg area at Menzinger Straße 67, München, Bavaria, Germany. A center for data science and biodiversity informatics called SNSB IT Center is affiliated. Its library is open to the public; scientific collections are open to researchers by appointment.

The institution was established in 1813 by King Maximilian I Joseph of Bavaria to maintain the royal herbarium, which grew to include major collections from the Ludwig-Maximilians-Universität München and botanist Johann Christian Daniel von Schreber, a student of Carl von Linné. In 1817, Maximilian sent botanist Carl Friedrich Philipp von Martius on a three-year expedition to Brazil, and upon his return appointed him the herbarium's curator. Martius' collection of South American vascular plants is among the world's foremost at 25,000–30,000 specimens representing 7,300 species.

Today the herbarium contains about 3.2 million dried specimens of plants and fungi, which is estimated to reflect about 25% of the world's known plant species. It has major strengths in the flora of Bavaria and the Alps, and vascular plants of Brazil, Chile, Central Asia, and regions of Africa, as well as in lichens and fungi. As of 2009, collection sizes were approximately as follows: vascular plants (1,800,000 specimens); bryophytes (350,000 specimens); fungi (350,000 specimens); lichens (300,000 specimens); and algae (150,000 specimens). The collection of lichens is one of the largest in the world and includes that made by Ferdinand Christian Gustav Arnold and others who collected in the nineteenth century. The collection of fungi includes the fungarium of Gustav Niessl von Mayendorf. The herbarium grows at an average rate of 16,000 specimens per year.

The center's research focuses on exploration and study of European, South-East Asian and South American flowering plants as well as of fungi, lichens, and algae. It also offers expert advice and identification services for certain types of plants and fungi.

Between 1992 and 2004 the director was Hannes Hertel, although he had been acting as director since 1985 having started working there as a curator in 1973. As at 2021 the director of the Botanische Staatssammlung München is Prof. Dr. Gudrun Kadereit.

Since 2001 the Botanische Staatssammlung München is maintaining the database IndExs – Index of Exsiccatae with bibliographic and collection-related information on exsiccatae.

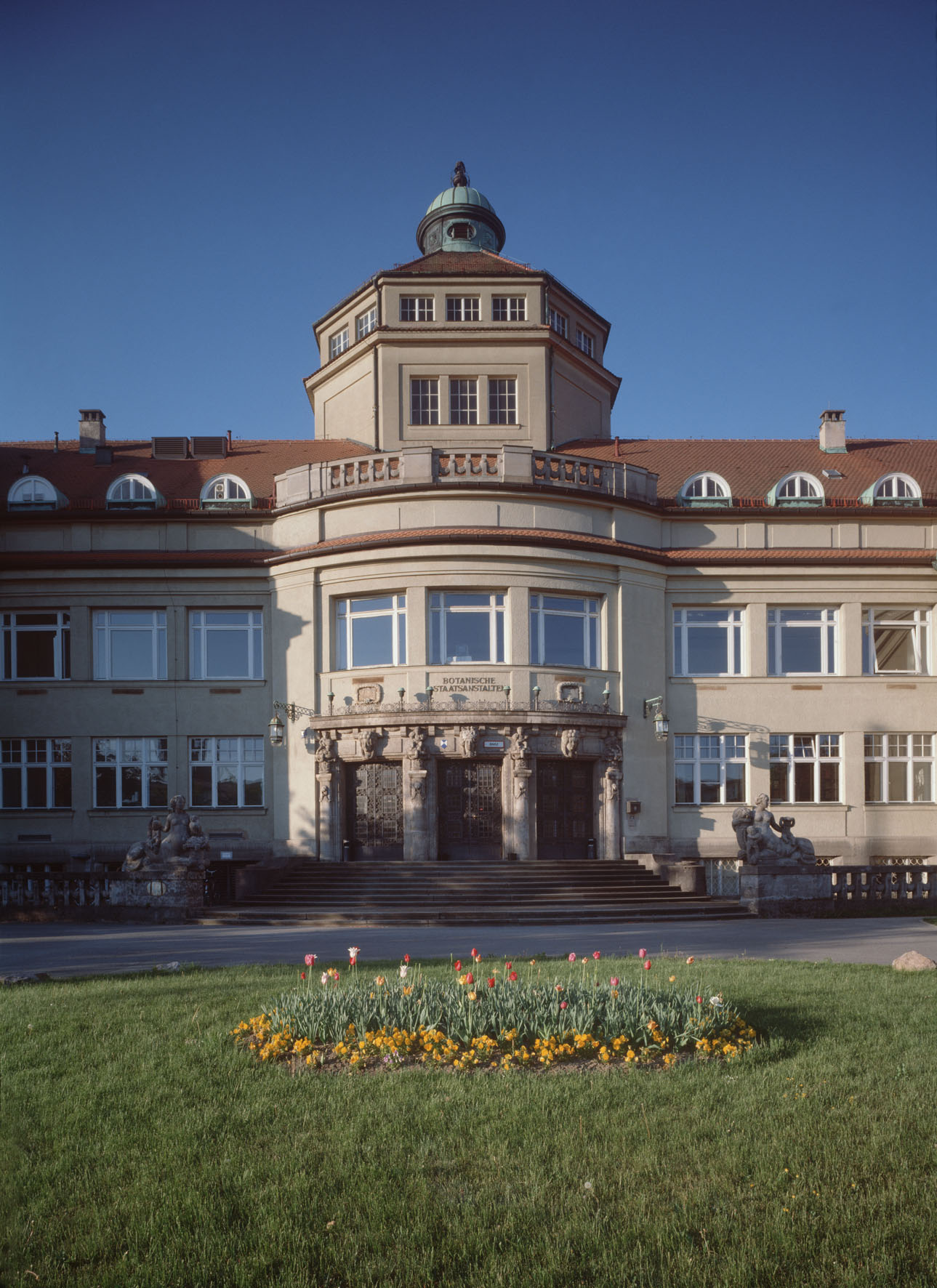

== See also ==
- Herbarium
- List of herbaria
