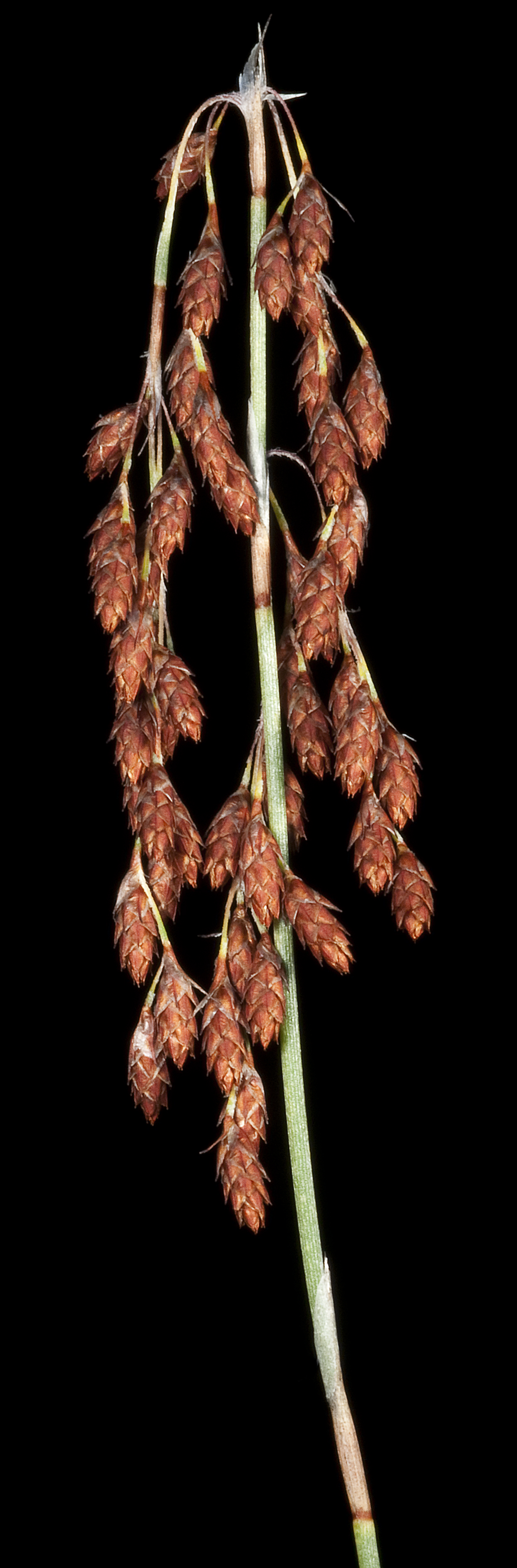
- Hypolaena Exsulca

Scientific classification
- Kingdom: Plantae
- Clade: Embryophytes
- Clade: Tracheophytes
- Clade: Angiosperms
- Clade: Monocots
- Clade: Commelinids
- Order: Poales
- Family: Restionaceae
- Genus: Hypolaena; R.Br.

Type species
- Hypolaena fastigiata R.Br.

= Hypolaena =

Genus of flowering plants

Hypolaena is a plant genus in the family Restionaceae, described as a genus in 1810. The entire genus is endemic to Australia.

Species

- Hypolaena caespitosa B.G.Briggs & L.A.S.Johnson - WA
- Hypolaena exsulca R.Br. - WA
- Hypolaena fastigiata R.Br. - Tassel Rope-rush - WA, SA, NSW, Vic, Tas, Qld
- Hypolaena grandiuscula F.Muell.
- Hypolaena humilis (Gilg.) B.G.Briggs & L.A.S.Johnson - WA
- Hypolaena pubescens (R.Br.) Nees - WA
- Hypolaena robusta Meney & Pate - WA
- Hypolaena viridis B.G.Briggs & L.A.S.Johnson - WA

formerly included

A few dozen other species have been placed in the genus over the years but are now considered members of other genera: Anthochortus Calorophus Chordifex Desmocladus Empodisma Loxocarya Mastersiella Platycaulos Restio Stenotalis
