= Anarthriaceae =

Family of flowering plants

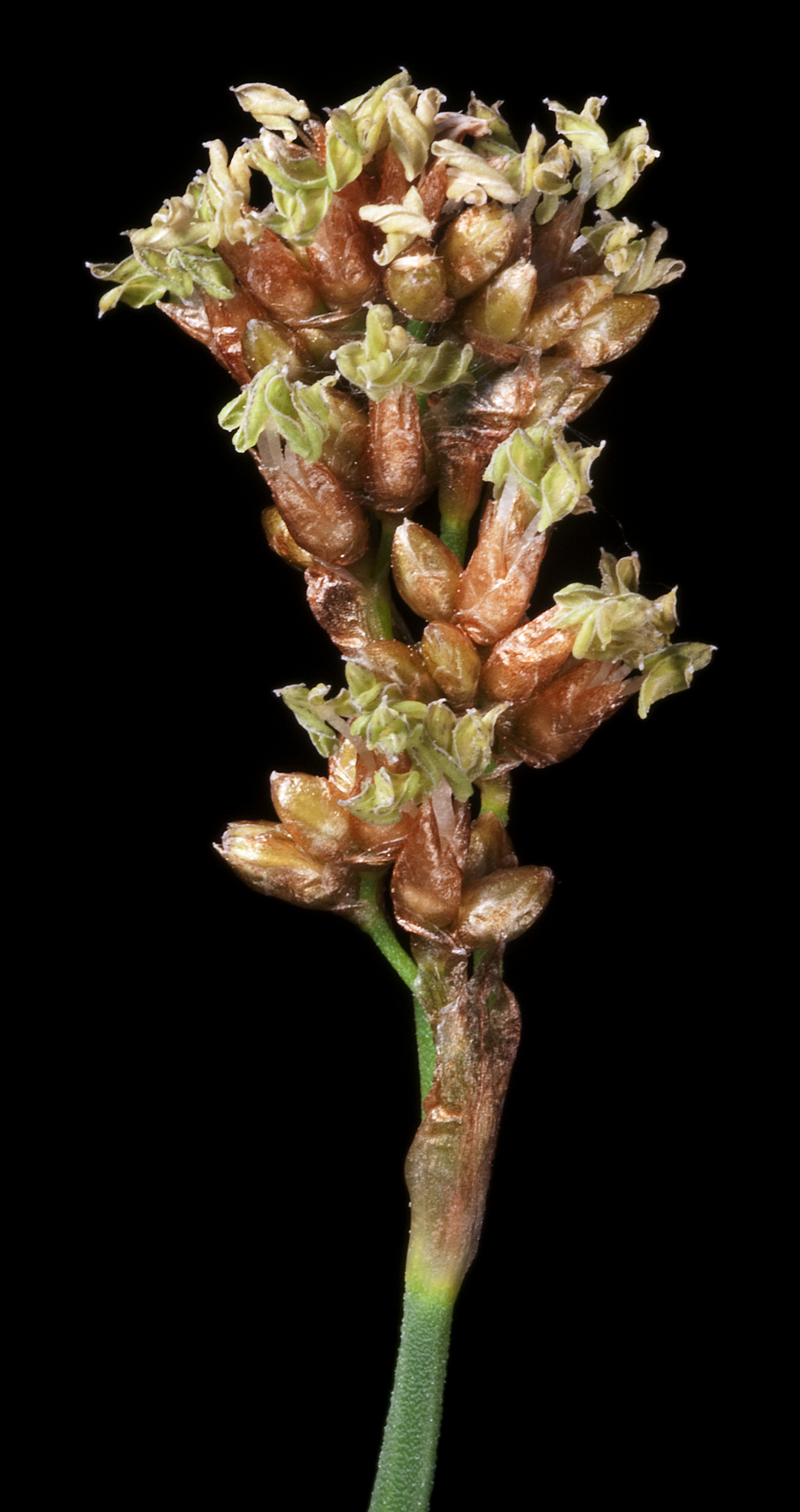
Hopkinsia anoectocolea

The Anarthriaceae was a family of three genera, Anarthria, Hopkinsia and Lyginia of flowering plants, now included in Restionaceae following APG IV (2016). The family is accepted in the Angiosperm Phylogeny Group's classification system, APG III system, but is not considered a separate family in many other taxonomic systems. The three genera are herbaceous but differ greatly in characteristics.

The APG II system, of 2003 (unchanged from the APG system, of 1998), did recognize this family, and assigned it to the order Poales in the clade commelinids, in the monocots. The family contains three genera and 10 species, and is found in Southwest Australia.
