= Ludwig Diels =

German botanist

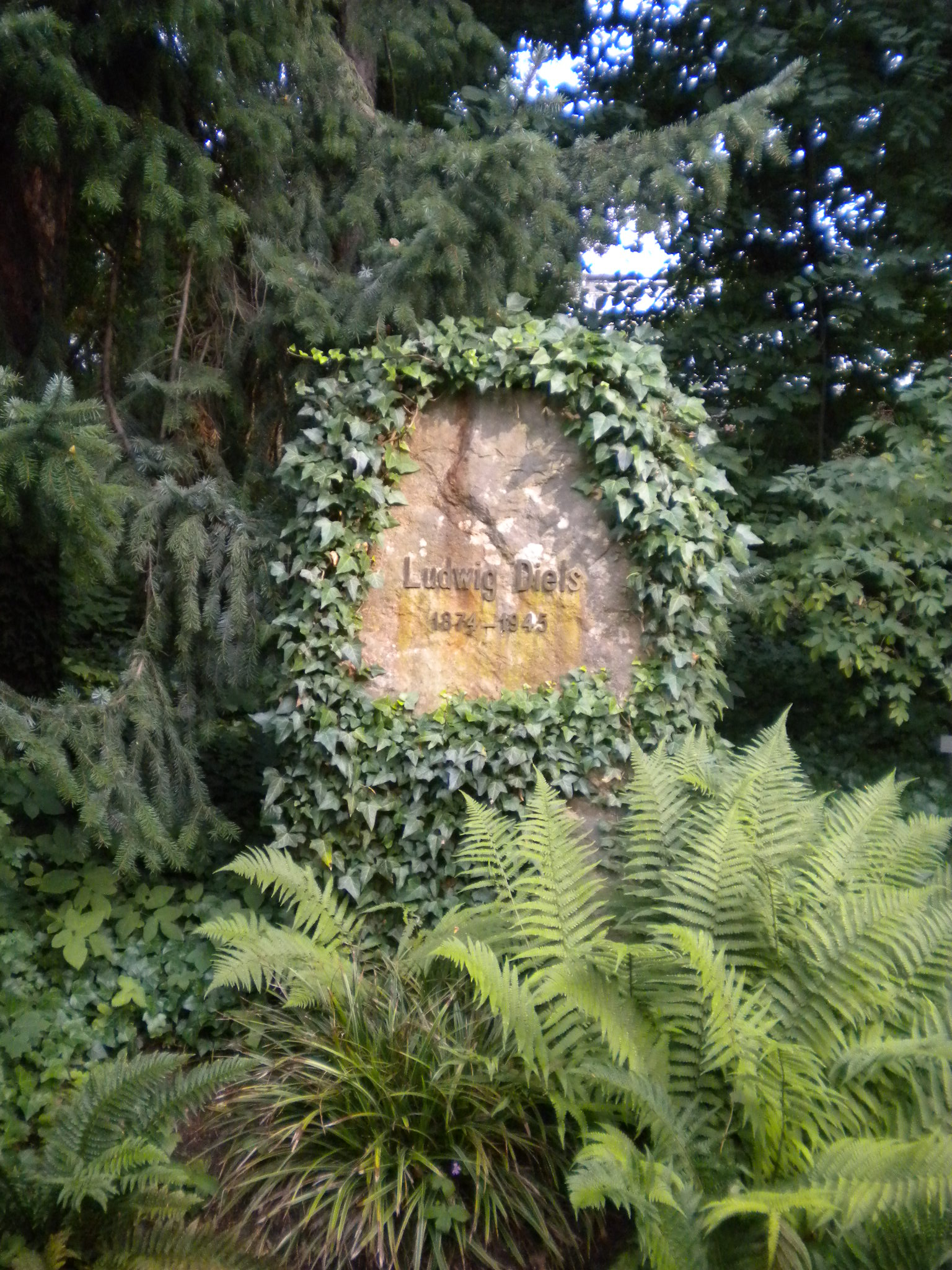
- Ludwig Diels's tombstone at botanical garden in Berlin-Dahlem
- Born: Friedrich Ludwig Emil Diels; 24 September 1874; Hamburg, German Empire
- Died: 30 November 1945 (aged 71); Berlin, Germany
- Father: Hermann Alexander Diels

Friedrich Ludwig Emil Diels (24 September 1874 – 30 November 1945) was a German botanist.

== Early life ==
Diels was born in Hamburg, the son of the classical scholar Hermann Alexander Diels. He grew up in Berlin. He studied botany and geography. In 1896 he completed his doctoral thesis on the vegetation of New Zealand. He then became an assistant to Adolf Engler and published several monographs with him.

== History ==
From 1900 to 1902 he travelled together with Ernst Georg Pritzel through South Africa, Java, Australia and New Zealand.

Shortly before the First World War he travelled through New Guinea, and in the 1930s he explored Ecuador. His collections of plants from Australia and Ecuador, which contained numerous holotypes, enriched the knowledge of the concerning floras. His monograph on the Droseraceae from 1906 is still a standard.

The majority of his collections were stored at the botanical garden in Berlin-Dahlem, of which he had been vice-director since 1913, and director from 1921 until 1945. His collections there were destroyed during an air raid in 1943. He died in Berlin on 30 November 1945.

The standard author abbreviation Diels is used to indicate this person as the author when citing a botanical name.

== Honours ==
Several genera of plants have been named after him including; Dielsantha (from Campanulaceae family), Dielsia (from Restionaceae), Dielsiocharis (from Brassicaceae) and Dielsiothamnus (from Annonaceae family). Also Dielitzia (from Asteraceae family), is named after Ludwig Diels and Ernst Georg Pritzel (1875–1946).
