= Dapsilanthus spathaceus =

Scientific classification
- Kingdom: Plantae
- Clade: Tracheophytes
- Clade: Angiosperms
- Clade: Monocots
- Clade: Commelinids
- Order: Poales
- Family: Restionaceae
- Genus: Dapsilanthus
- Species: D. spathaceus

Binomial name
- Dapsilanthus spathaceus (R.Br.) B.G.Briggs & L.A.S.Johnson

Synonyms
- Leptocarpus spathaceus R.Br.

Species of flowering plant

Dapsilanthus spathaceus is a species of flowering plant of the family Restionaceae native to Australia.
