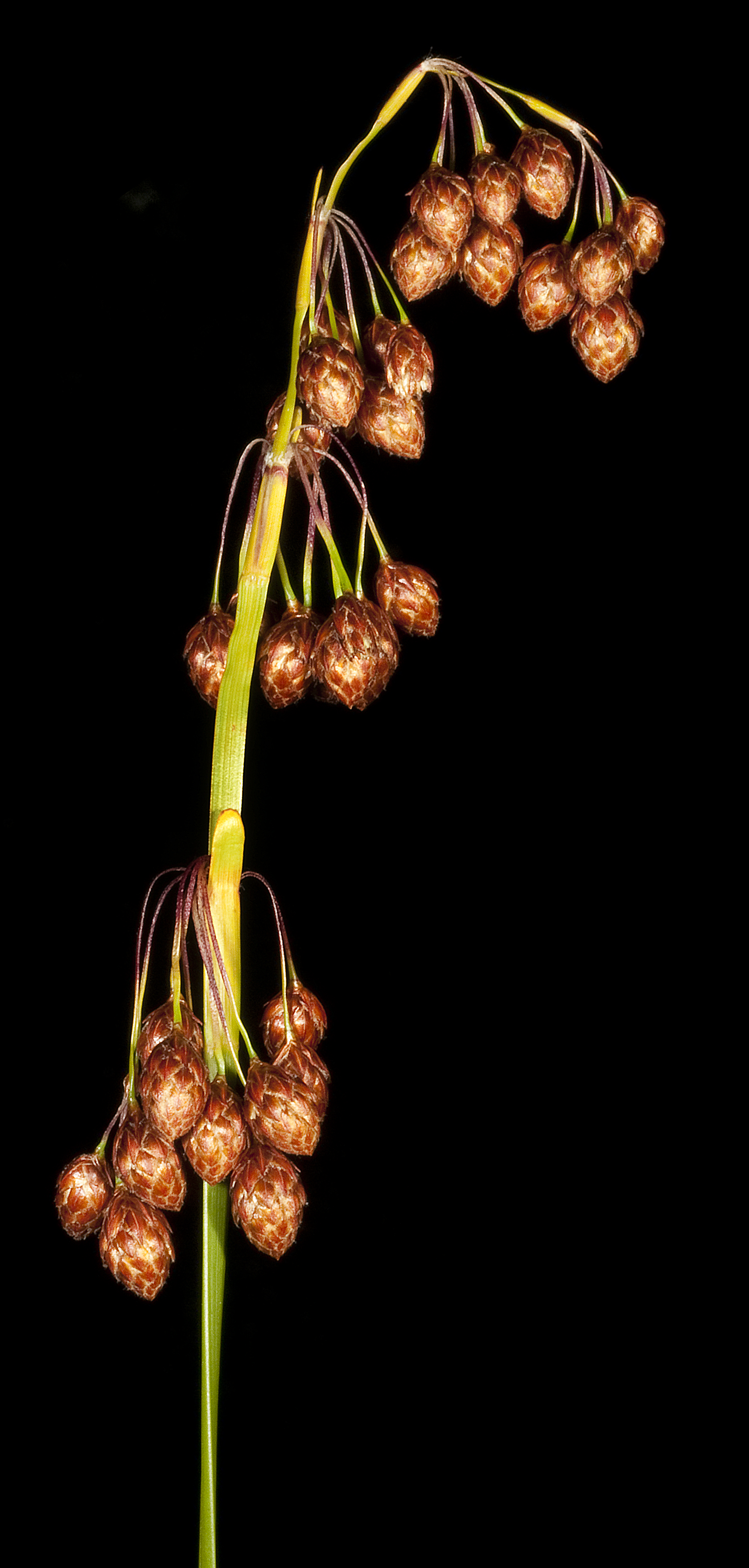

Scientific classification
- Kingdom: Plantae
- Clade: Tracheophytes
- Clade: Angiosperms
- Clade: Monocots
- Clade: Commelinids
- Order: Poales
- Family: Restionaceae
- Genus: Tremulina
- Species: T. tremula

Binomial name
- Tremulina tremula (R.Br.) B.G.Briggs & L.A.S.Johnson

= Tremulina tremula =

Species of plant

Tremulina tremula is a plant in the Restionaceae family, found in the south-west of Western Australia.

It was first described in 1810 by Robert Brown as Restio tremulus, but was transferred to the genus Tremulina in 1998 by Barbara Briggs & Lawrie Johnson.

The species epithet, tremula, is a Latin adjective (tremulus, -a, -um, derived from the verb, tremere, "to tremble"), which describes the plant as trembling or shaking.
