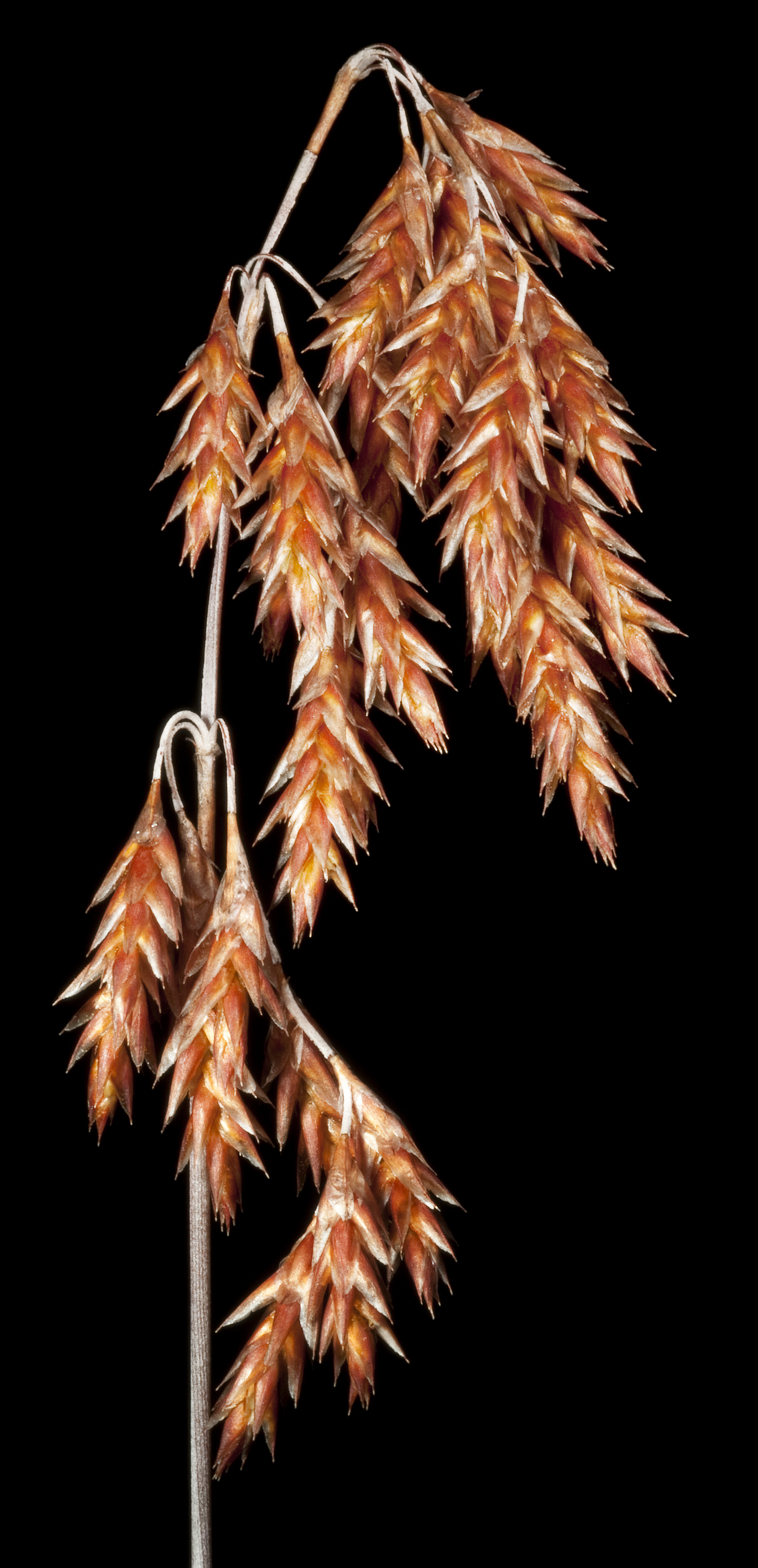
- Chaetanthus aristatus (male)

Scientific classification
- Kingdom: Plantae
- Clade: Tracheophytes
- Clade: Angiosperms
- Clade: Monocots
- Clade: Commelinids
- Order: Poales
- Family: Restionaceae
- Genus: Chaetanthus
- Species: C. aristatus

Binomial name
- Chaetanthus aristatus (R.Br.) B.G.Briggs & L.A.S.Johnson

Synonyms
- Leptocarpus aristatus R.Br. Leptocarpus erianthus Benth. Restio brownii Kunth

= Chaetanthus aristatus =

Species of flowering plant

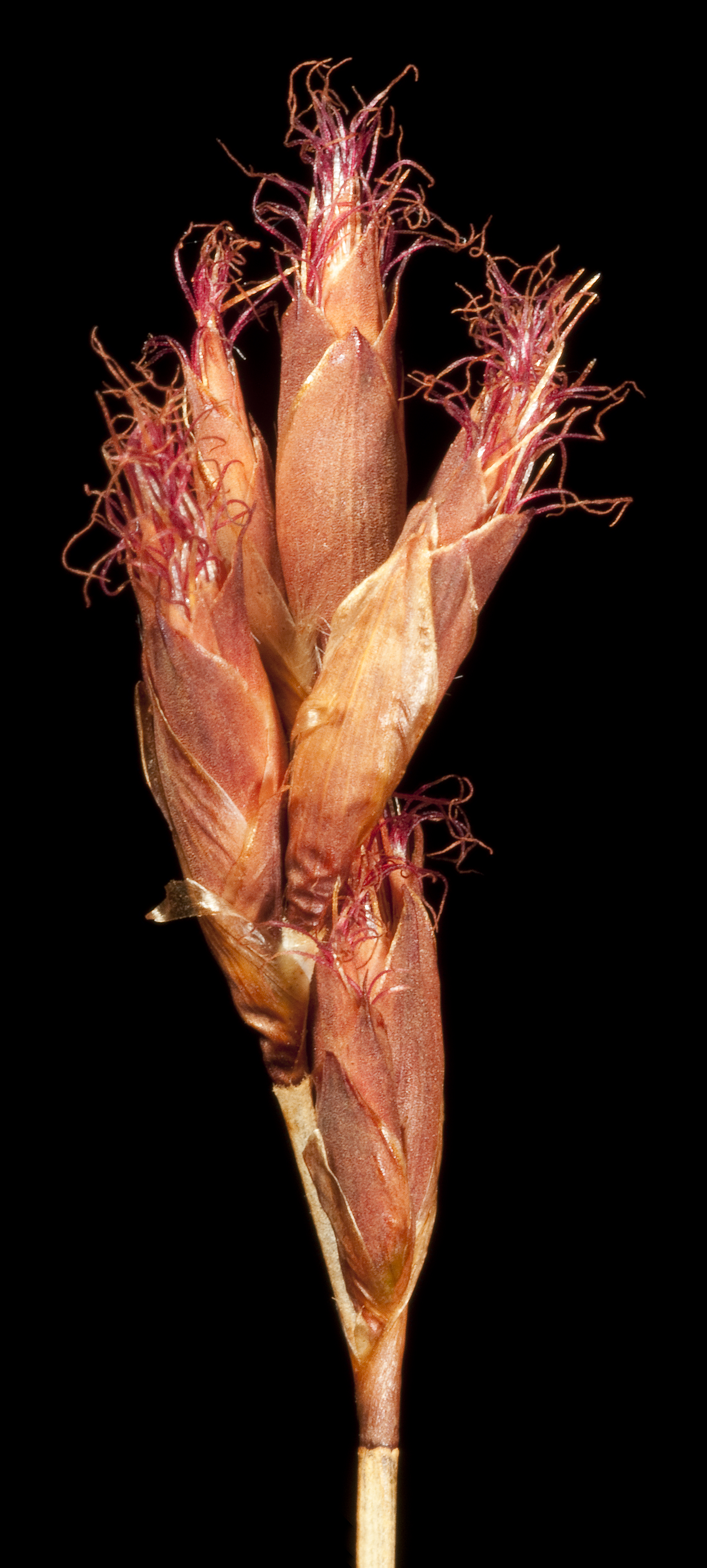
Chaetanthus aristatus (female)

Chaetanthus aristatus is a species of rush (in the family Restionaceae). It is found in Western Australia.

The species was first described as Leptocarpus aristatus in 1810 by Robert Brown, but was transferred in 1998 by Barbara Briggs and L.A.S. Johnson to the genus, Chaetanthus.
