= Winifredia =

Scientific classification
- Kingdom: Plantae
- Clade: Tracheophytes
- Clade: Angiosperms
- Clade: Monocots
- Clade: Commelinids
- Order: Poales
- Family: Restionaceae
- Genus: Winifredia; L.A.S.Johnson & B.G.Briggs
- Species: W. sola

Binomial name
- Winifredia sola L.A.S.Johnson & B.G.Briggs

Genus of flowering plants

Winifredia is a group of plants in the Restionaceae described as a genus in 1986. There is only one known species, Winifredia sola, a rhizomatous geophyte endemic to southwestern Tasmania.
