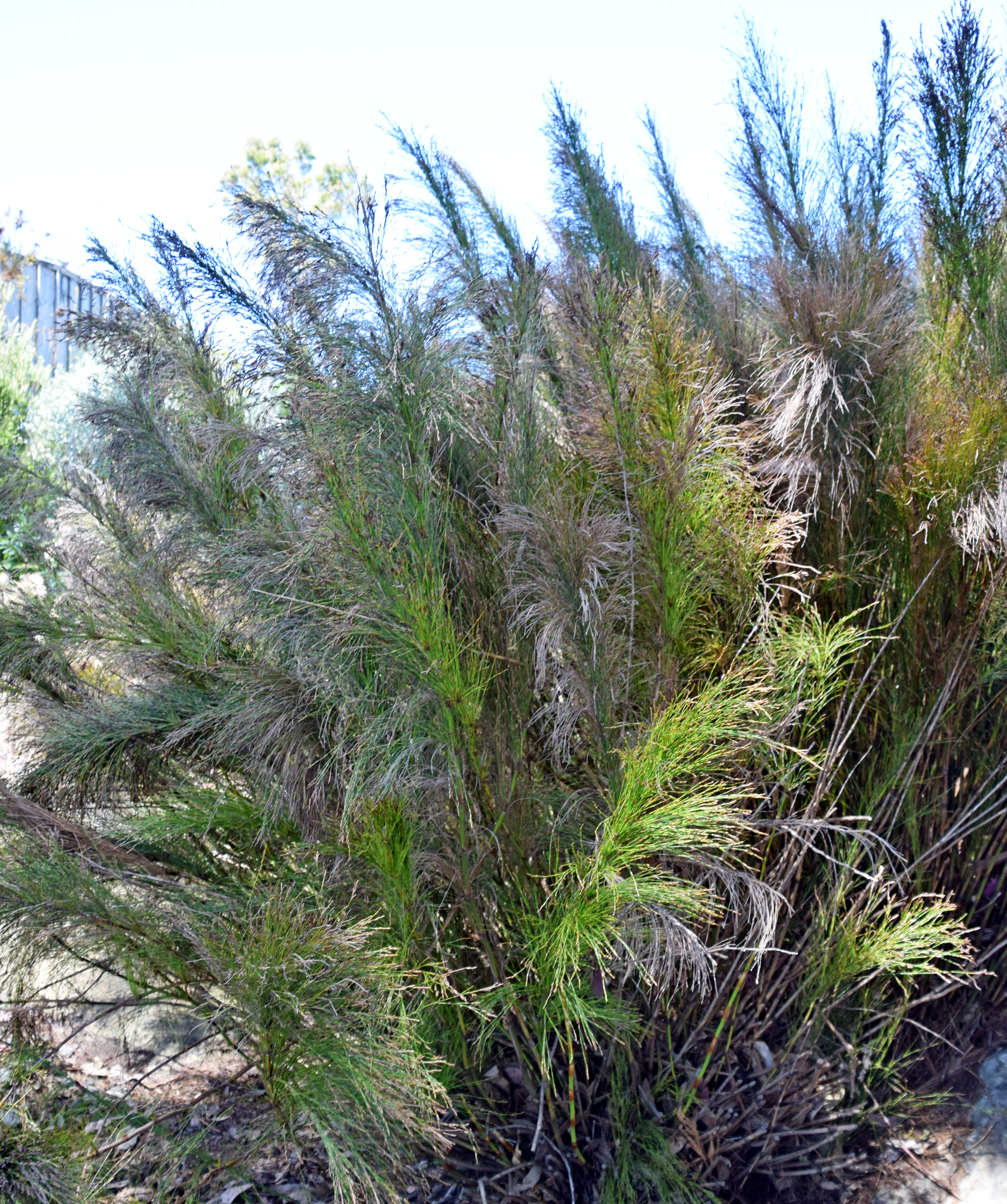

Scientific classification
- Kingdom: Plantae
- Clade: Tracheophytes
- Clade: Angiosperms
- Clade: Monocots
- Clade: Commelinids
- Order: Poales
- Family: Restionaceae
- Genus: Restio
- Species: R. subverticillatus

Binomial name
- Restio subverticillatus (Steud.) Mast.

= Restio subverticillatus =

Species of flowering plant

Restio subverticillatus, the whorled restio, is a species of flowering plant in the family Restionaceae. It is endemic to the southwestern Cape Provinces of South Africa.

Growing to 2.5 m (8.2 ft) tall and 1.5 m (4.9 ft) broad, it is a tufted perennial with arching reed-like stems. Modified branches at each node produce whorls of foliage. It is dioecious, meaning that female and male plants are separate. Flowering in Spring, female flowers are white, while male flowers are yellow/grey.

This plant has won the Royal Horticultural Society's Award of Garden Merit. It is grown primarily for its elegant arching foliage. As it does not bear temperatures below freezing, it requires protection during the winter months in colder areas.

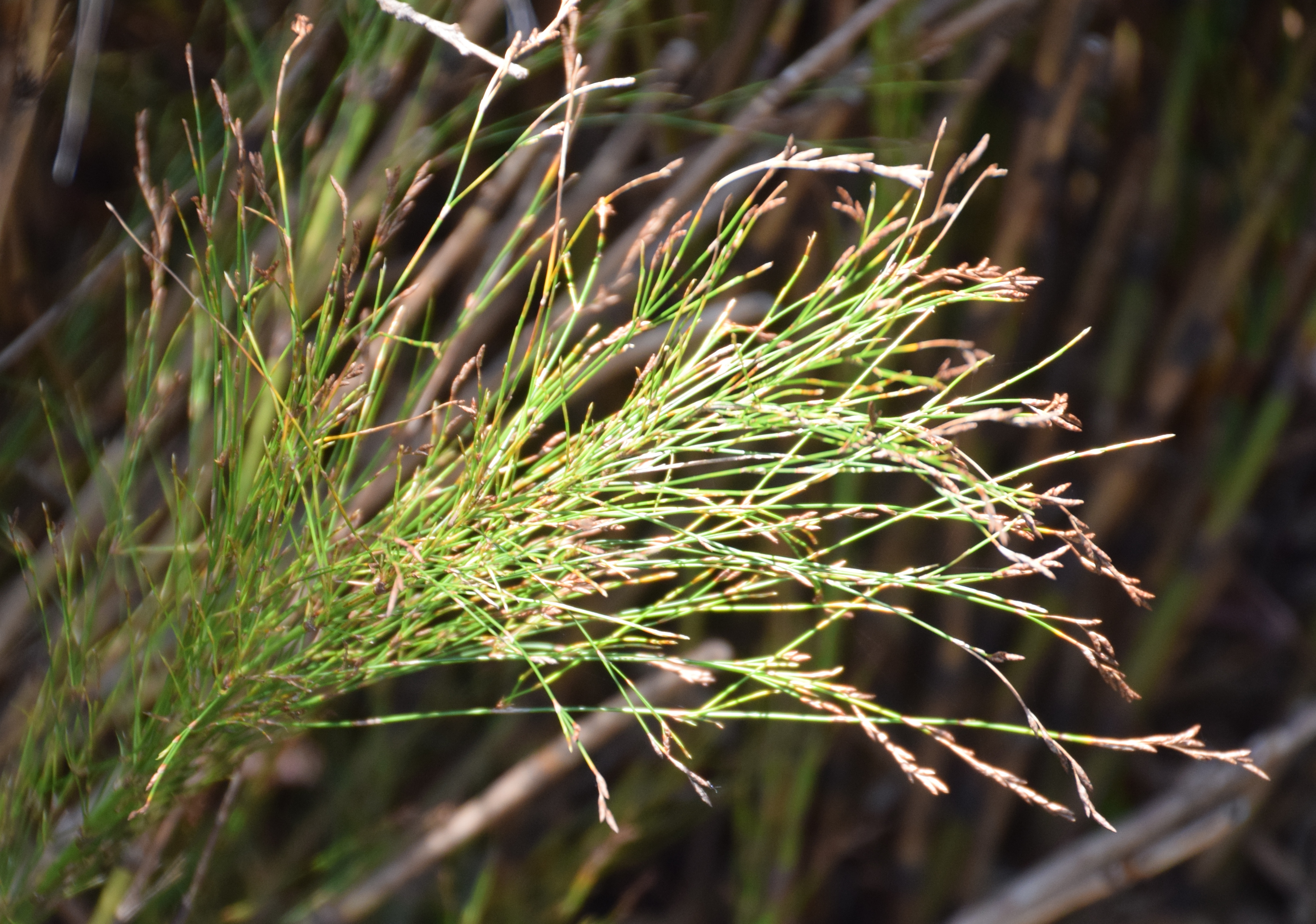

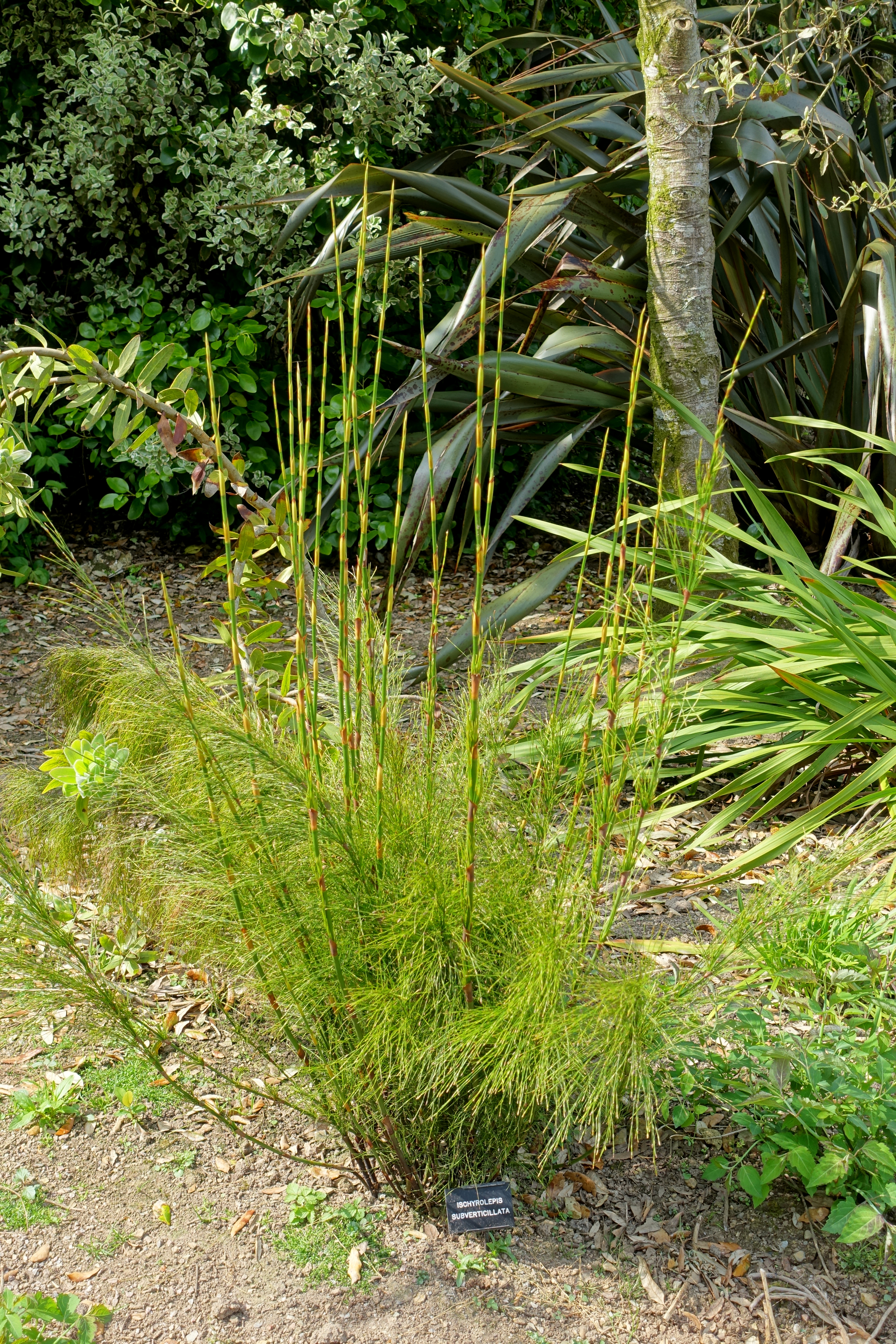
