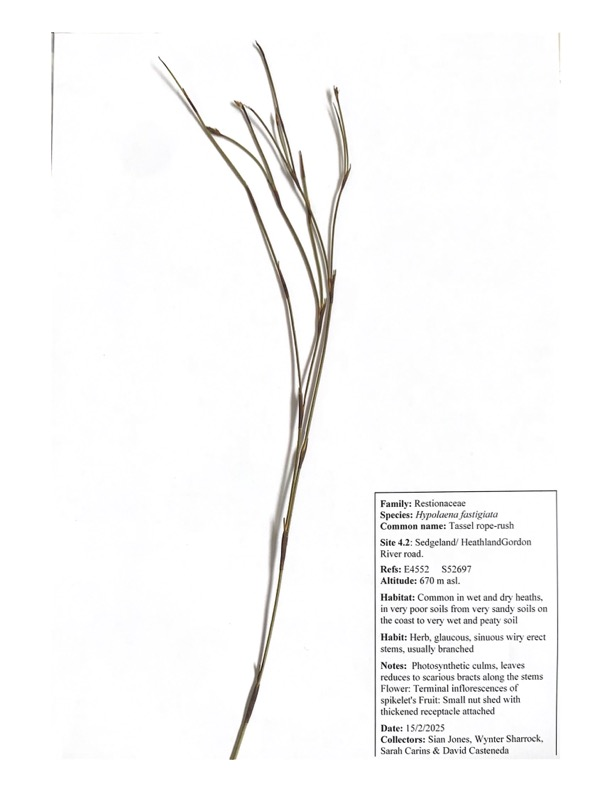

Scientific classification
- Kingdom: Plantae
- Clade: Tracheophytes
- Clade: Angiosperms
- Clade: Monocots
- Clade: Commelinids
- Order: Poales
- Family: Restionaceae
- Genus: Hypolaena
- Species: H. fastigiata

Binomial name
- Hypolaena fastigiata R.Br.

= Hypolaena fastigiata =

Species of plant

Hypolaena fastigiata, commonly known as tassel rope-rush or bundled rope rush, is a plant species in the family Restionaceae. It is endemic to Australia, and commonly found in sandy-soil habitats. It is distinctive among other species in Hypolaena due to ascending culms with a round cross section, glaucous colour when young, glabrous when mature, and very small fruit dangling creating a tassal like appearance.

== Description ==
Hypolaena fastigiata is a perennial, diecious herb that spreads from rhizomes, forming diffuse patches up to 2m across. Arising from the rhizomes are culms that are usually straight to sinuous or flexuosa, 20-60 cm long and can be very branched. They are round in cross section, have 1-2 mm diameter and are glaucous in colour. The leaves along the culms have been reduced to scales that are dark brown in colour and cover brown pubescence. At the base on the culms brown erect sheaths are closely spaced and are around 1.5 cm long.

Spikelets of Hypolaena fastigiata are diagnostically a dark brown-red in colour. Male spikelets are pedicellate, found singularly or in clusters on the upper nodes of culms and covered in whitish hairs. They are cylindrical in shape becoming elliptical to obovoid, 2-3 mm long and bear 15-20 glumes. The Male flowers bear long stamens around 1.2 mm. Female spikelets are sessile, terminal and solitary on the uppermost nodes of the culms. They are erect, narrow-cylindrical, glabrous and are 6-15 m long. The female flowers have tepals that are less 1mm in length, another diagnostic feature of the plant. The plant flowers throughout the year, especially from August to December. The fruit of the plant is nut with woody pericarp is ovoid in shape and 2-4.5 mm in length.

== Habitat & Distribution ==
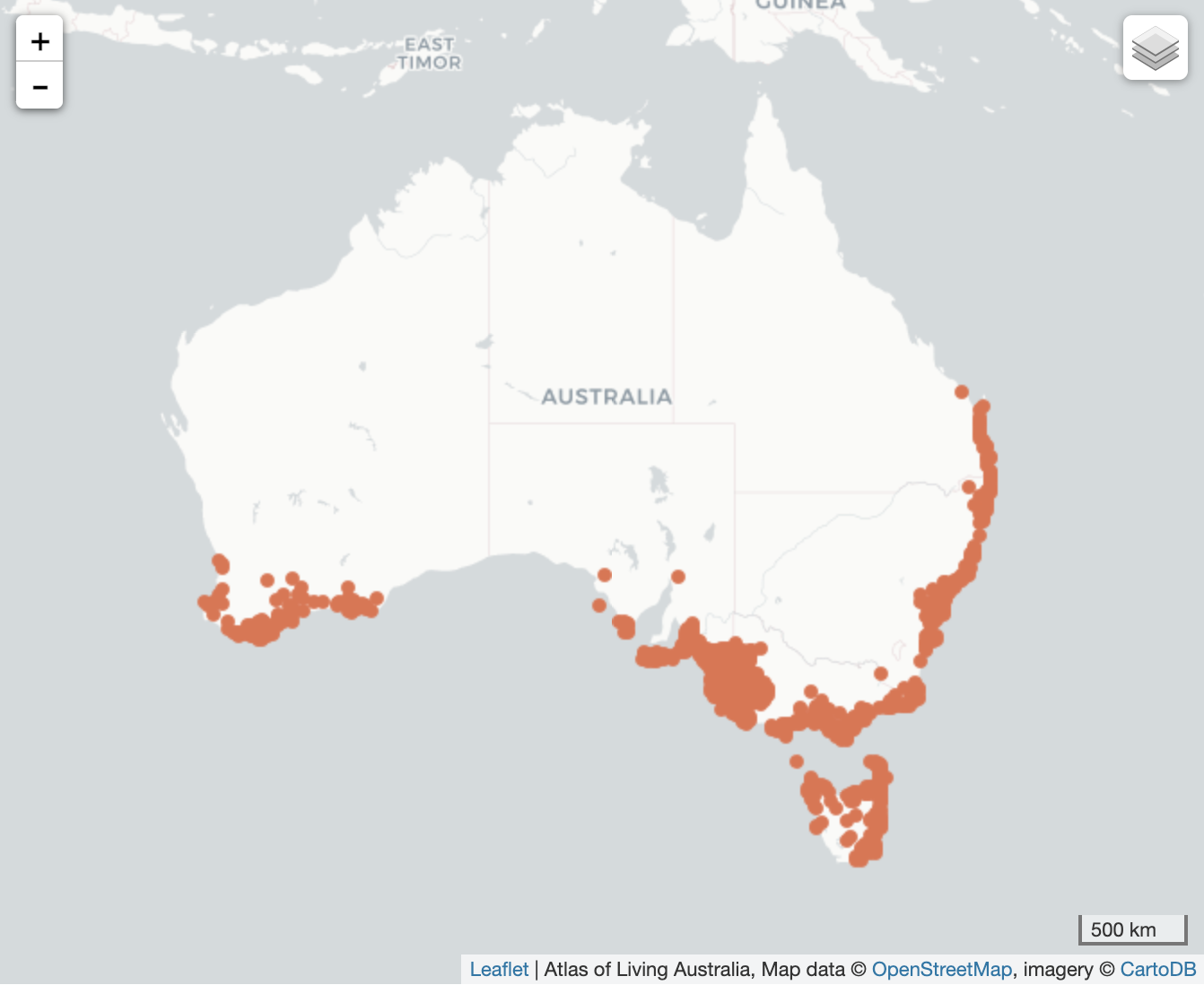
Distribution of Hypolaena fastigiata in Australia from Atlas of Living Australia

Hypolaena fastigiata is native to Australia and widespread throughout Tasmania, southern Queensland, New South Wales, Victoria, Western Australia and South Australia. It is the only species within the Hypolaena genus to be found outside of Western Australia. They have fairly wide habitat distribution but are usually found in damp or fairly dry sandy soils in heathland or peatland or the margins of swamps. They are widespread in coastal heathlands and wallums, as well as distributing inland due to peatlands presence, especially within Tasmania from peat appearing above sandy soil.

== Ecology ==
Because Hypolaena fastigiata grows in rhizmotus manner, it can form dense clumps as well as highly profuse roots clumps that can reach up to 2 meters. This can help stabilise soil structure, especially because they grow in sandy soils. There roots can also allow them to resprout after fires, which is highly important for the regeneration of habitats after disturbances. They are also a facultative seeder which further aids in regeneration after fires. Studies have also found that in regards to water relations is sensitive to change in soil moisture, this can be used as an indicator on the health of ecosystem. The dense clusters of culms formed by H. fastigiata can also provide habitat for many ground dwelling mammals and has been found to provide nesting for ground parrots.

== Threats and Conservation ==
Because this species is fairly deep rooted, especially in areas where they need to reach sandy soil to have good drainage, this can limit their habitat in areas that have been disturbed and disrupted from unnatural processes. Within South Australia there are several populations located in different areas that have been identified as near threatened or rare due to limited habitat available and threat of weeds. This species has not been listed in the IUCN Red List or classified but it is assumed that the species is of least concern due to its distribution.

== Taxonomy and Etymology ==
Hypolaena fastigiata is from the Restionaceae family within the Poales family. One of the diagnostic and distinguishing features of the genus Hypolaena compared to other species within Restionaceae is the presence of pillar cells within the chlorenchyma as well as striate culms and small fruit with woody pericarp which are borne on stems. H. fastigiata was first described in 1810 by Robertus Brown. The 'Hypolaena' comes from the Greek hypo (beneath) and chlaina, laina (a cloak), referring to the perianth remaining attached to the base of the fruit, where as fastigiata' is from the Latin fastigiatus (with clustered branches), referring to the habit of the plants.
