= Lepidobolus drapetocoleus =

Scientific classification
- Kingdom: Plantae
- Clade: Tracheophytes
- Clade: Angiosperms
- Clade: Monocots
- Clade: Commelinids
- Order: Poales
- Family: Restionaceae
- Genus: Lepidobolus
- Species: L. drapetocoleus

Binomial name
- Lepidobolus drapetocoleus F.Muell.

Species of plant

Lepidobolus drapetocoleus is a species of plant native to the Australian states of South Australia and Victoria.
