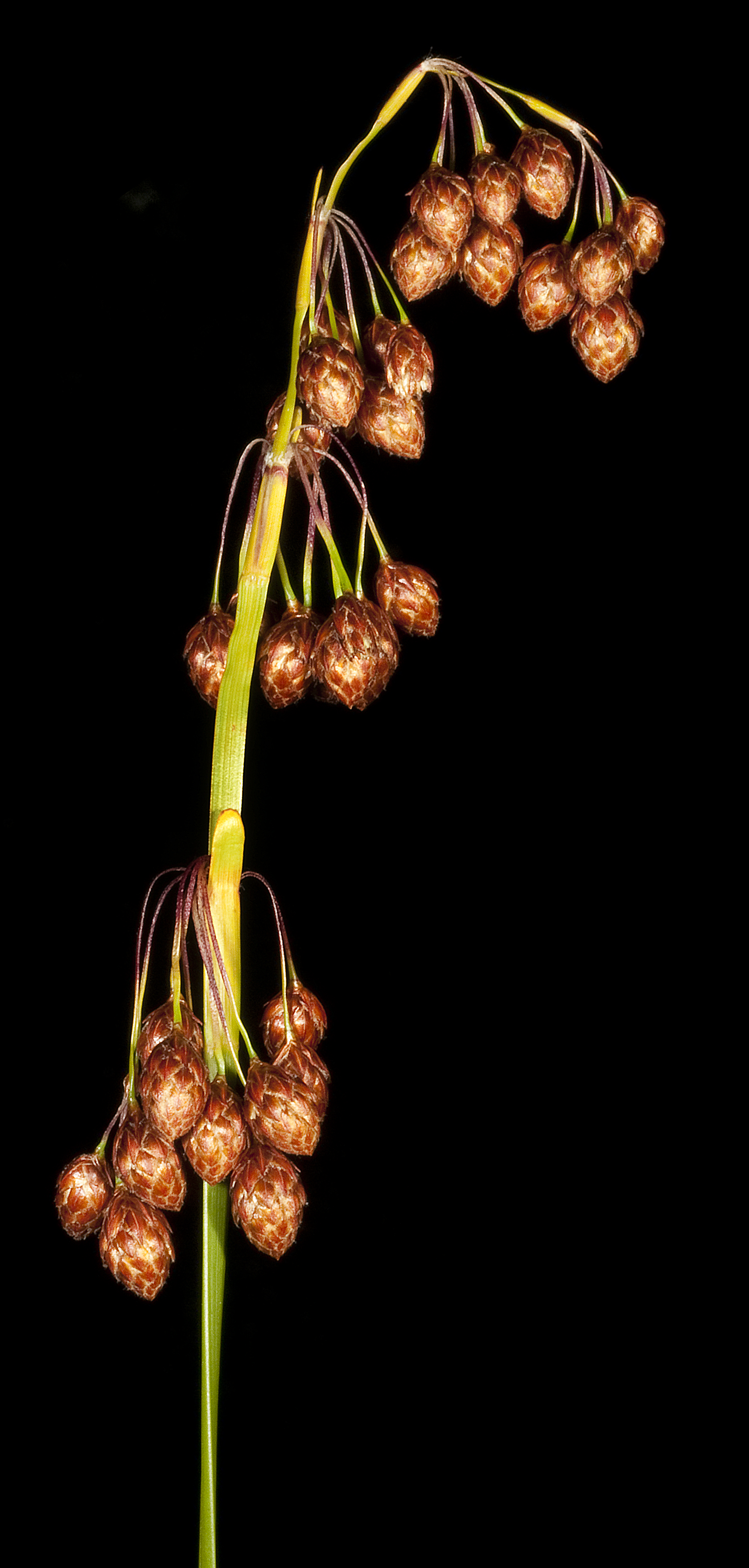
- Tremulina tremula

Scientific classification
- Kingdom: Plantae
- Clade: Tracheophytes
- Clade: Angiosperms
- Clade: Monocots
- Clade: Commelinids
- Order: Poales
- Family: Restionaceae
- Genus: Tremulina; B.G.Briggs & L.A.S.Johnson

Type species
- Tremulina tremula B.G.Briggs & L.A.S.Johnson

= Tremulina =

Genus of flowering plants

Tremulina is a genus of flowering plants belonging to the family Restionaceae. The genus was first described in 1998 by Barbara Briggs and Lawrie Johnson. The type species is Tremulina tremula.

Its native range is Southwestern Australia.

Species:

- Tremulina cracens B.G.Briggs & L.A.S.Johnson
- Tremulina tremula (R.Br.) B.G.Briggs & L.A.S.Johnson
