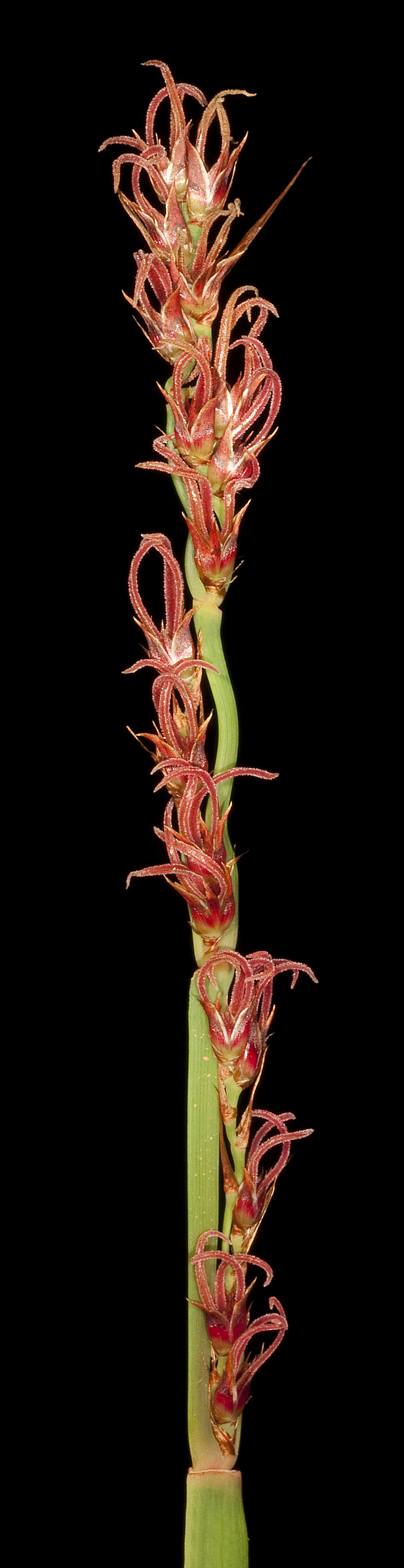

Scientific classification
- Kingdom: Plantae
- Clade: Tracheophytes
- Clade: Angiosperms
- Clade: Monocots
- Clade: Commelinids
- Order: Poales
- Family: Restionaceae
- Genus: Anarthria
- Species: A. scabra

Binomial name
- Anarthria scabra R.Br. 1810

= Anarthria scabra =

Species of flowering plant

Anarthria scabra is an herbaceous plant found in Southwest Australia.

== Description ==
The form is sedge- or rush-like, with groups of flowers that present a brown and yellow inflorescence; this appears around August to December, the height of this robust plant is 0.35 to 1.5 metres. The perennial leaves emerge from a rhizomatous base, usually long and sedge-like these are typically hairless with an entire margin. They occur at sand dunes on white or grey sand, or peaty sands, often in areas that are wet in winter. The distribution range is coastal and sub coastal habitat from the Swan Coastal Plain, south of Perth, to the increasingly arid Esperance Plains.

== Taxonomy ==
The plant was first described by Robert Brown in 1810.
