= Catacolea =

Scientific classification
- Kingdom: Plantae
- Clade: Tracheophytes
- Clade: Angiosperms
- Clade: Monocots
- Clade: Commelinids
- Order: Poales
- Family: Restionaceae
- Genus: Catacolea; B.G.Briggs & L.A.S.Johnson
- Species: C. enodis

Binomial name
- Catacolea enodis B.G.Briggs & L.A.S.Johnson

Genus of flowering plants

Catacolea is a genus of flowering plants belonging to the family Restionaceae. The only species is Catacolea enodis.

Its native range is Southwestern Australia.
