= Platychorda =

Scientific classification
- Kingdom: Plantae
- Clade: Tracheophytes
- Clade: Angiosperms
- Clade: Monocots
- Clade: Commelinids
- Order: Poales
- Family: Restionaceae
- Genus: Platychorda; B.G.Briggs & L.A.S.Johnson

Genus of plants

Platychorda is a genus of flowering plants belonging to the family Restionaceae.

Its native range is Southwestern Australia.

Species:

- Platychorda applanata (Spreng.) B.G.Briggs & L.A.S.Johnson
- Platychorda rivalis B.G.Briggs & L.A.S.Johnson
