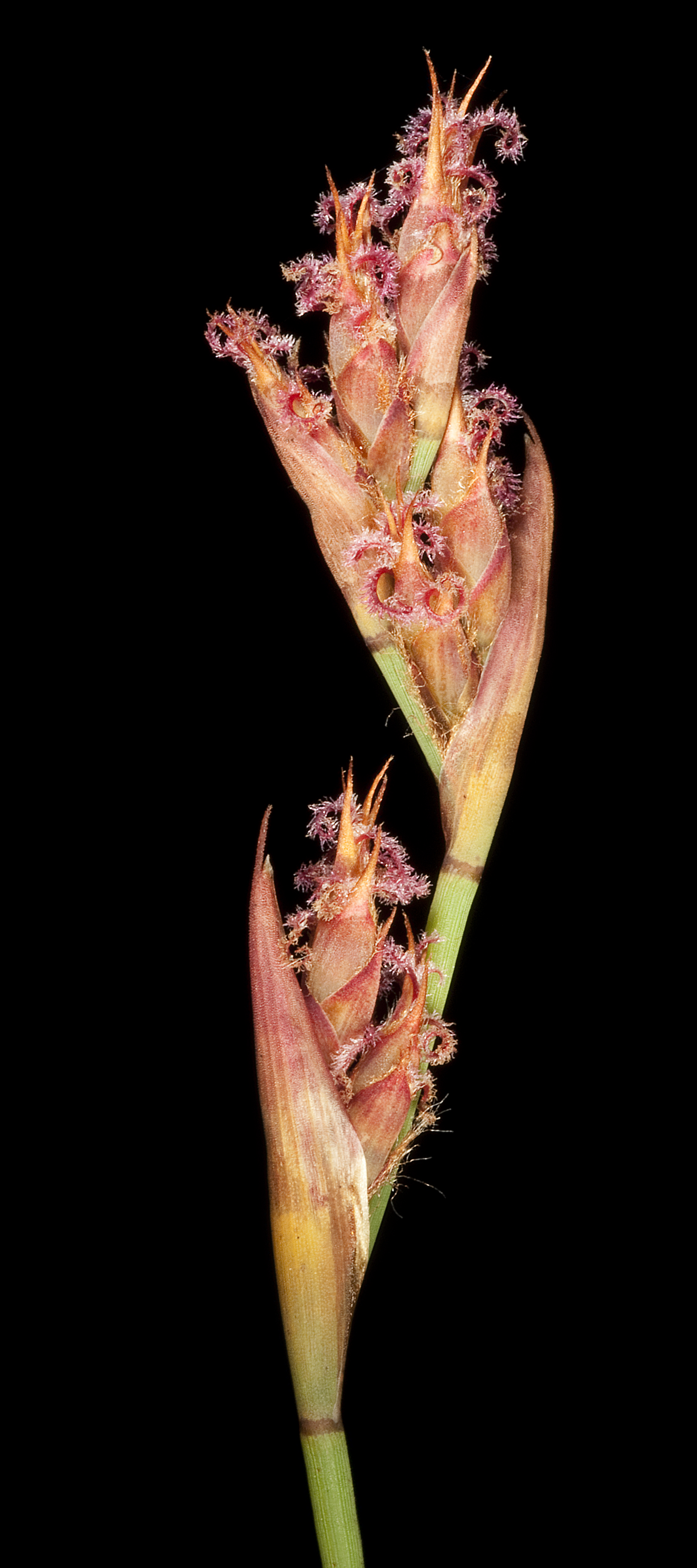
- Cytogonidium leptocarpoides

Scientific classification
- Kingdom: Plantae
- Clade: Embryophytes
- Clade: Tracheophytes
- Clade: Spermatophytes
- Clade: Angiosperms
- Clade: Monocots
- Clade: Commelinids
- Order: Poales
- Family: Restionaceae
- Genus: Cytogonidium; B.G.Briggs & L.A.S.Johnson
- Species: C. leptocarpoides

Binomial name
- Cytogonidium leptocarpoides (Benth.) B.G.Briggs & L.A.S.Johnson

Synonyms
- Restio leptocarpoides Benth.

= Cytogonidium =

Genus of flowering plants

Cytogonidium is a genus of flowering plants belonging to the family Restionaceae. It contains a single species, Cytogonidium leptocarpoides, which is native to Southwest Australia.
