= Tyrbastes =

Scientific classification
- Kingdom: Plantae
- Clade: Tracheophytes
- Clade: Angiosperms
- Clade: Monocots
- Clade: Commelinids
- Order: Poales
- Family: Restionaceae
- Genus: Tyrbastes; B.G.Briggs & L.A.S.Johnson
- Species: T. glaucescens

Binomial name
- Tyrbastes glaucescens B.G.Briggs & L.A.S.Johnson

Genus of flowering plants

Tyrbastes is a genus of flowering plants belonging to the family Restionaceae. It includes a single species, Tyrbastes glaucescens, a perennial native to Southwest Australia.
