= Empodisma gracillimum =

Scientific classification
- Kingdom: Plantae
- Clade: Tracheophytes
- Clade: Angiosperms
- Clade: Monocots
- Clade: Commelinids
- Order: Poales
- Family: Restionaceae
- Genus: Empodisma
- Species: E. gracillimum

Binomial name
- Empodisma gracillimum (F.Muell.) L.A.S.Johnson & D.F.Cutler

Species of flowering plant

Empodisma gracillimum is a species of sedge-like plant endemic to coastal areas of Southwest Australia. Described within an Australian and New Zealand genus of the rush- or bamboo-like Restionaceae family, it is the only species of Empodisma to be found in Western Australia.

A perennial herb, growing to a height between 0.2 and 1.2 metres, found near winter wet ground and permanent waterways. The inflorescence is brown, appearing between July and December or January and February. The preferred soil type is grey to black sand and peat. The habit of the species is to cluster together, the leaves becoming an entangled barrier that inspired the Greek derivation of the genus and its common name of wire rush. The rhizomatous roots form dense mats that retain water, the detritus of the plant assemblage creating a peat habitat that is also occupied by bryophytes.

The species was formerly named Calorophus gracillimum, by Ferdinand von Mueller, until the erection of a new genus that split out Empodisma minus and E. gracillimum.
