= Onychosepalum =

Scientific classification
- Kingdom: Plantae
- Clade: Tracheophytes
- Clade: Angiosperms
- Clade: Monocots
- Clade: Commelinids
- Order: Poales
- Family: Restionaceae
- Genus: Onychosepalum; Steud.

Type species
- Onychosepalum laxiflorum Steud.

Genus of flowering plants

Onychosepalum is a plant genus in the family Restionaceae, described as a genus in 1855.

The entire genus is endemic to the State of Western Australia.

Species

- Onychosepalum laxiflorum Steud.
- Onychosepalum microcarpum Meney & Pate
- Onychosepalum nodatum B.G.Briggs & L.A.S.Johnson
