= Hydrophilus =

Hydrophilus is the scientific name of two genera of organisms and may refer to:

- Hydrophilus (insect), a genus of beetles in the family Hydrophilidae
- Hydrophilus (plant), a genus of plants in the family Restionaceae
