= Dapsilanthus =

Scientific classification
- Kingdom: Plantae
- Clade: Tracheophytes
- Clade: Angiosperms
- Clade: Monocots
- Clade: Commelinids
- Order: Poales
- Family: Restionaceae
- Genus: Dapsilanthus; B.G.Briggs & L.A.S.Johnson

Genus of flowering plants

Dapsilanthus is a genus of plants described as a genus in 1998.

Dapsilanthus is native to Southeast Asia, southern China, New Guinea, and northern Australia.

== Species ==
- Dapsilanthus disjunctus (Mast.) B.G.Briggs & L.A.S.Johnson - Guangxi, Hainan, Cambodia, Laos, W Malaysia, Thailand, Vietnam
- Dapsilanthus elatior (R.Br.) B.G.Briggs & L.A.S.Johnson - Queensland, Northern Territory, New Guinea, Aru Islands in Maluku
- Dapsilanthus ramosus (R.Br.) B.G.Briggs & L.A.S.Johnson - Queensland
- Dapsilanthus spathaceus (R.Br.) B.G.Briggs & L.A.S.Johnson - Queensland, Northern Territory, New Guinea, Aru Islands in Maluku
