= Melanostachya =

Scientific classification
- Kingdom: Plantae
- Clade: Tracheophytes
- Clade: Angiosperms
- Clade: Monocots
- Clade: Commelinids
- Order: Poales
- Family: Restionaceae
- Genus: Melanostachya; B.G.Briggs & L.A.S.Johnson
- Species: M. ustulata

Binomial name
- Melanostachya ustulata (F.Muell. ex Ewart & Sharman) B.G.Briggs & L.A.S.Johnson

Genus of plants

Melanostachya is a monotypic genus of flowering plants belonging to the family Restionaceae. The only species is Melanostachya ustulata.

Its native range is Southwestern Australia.
