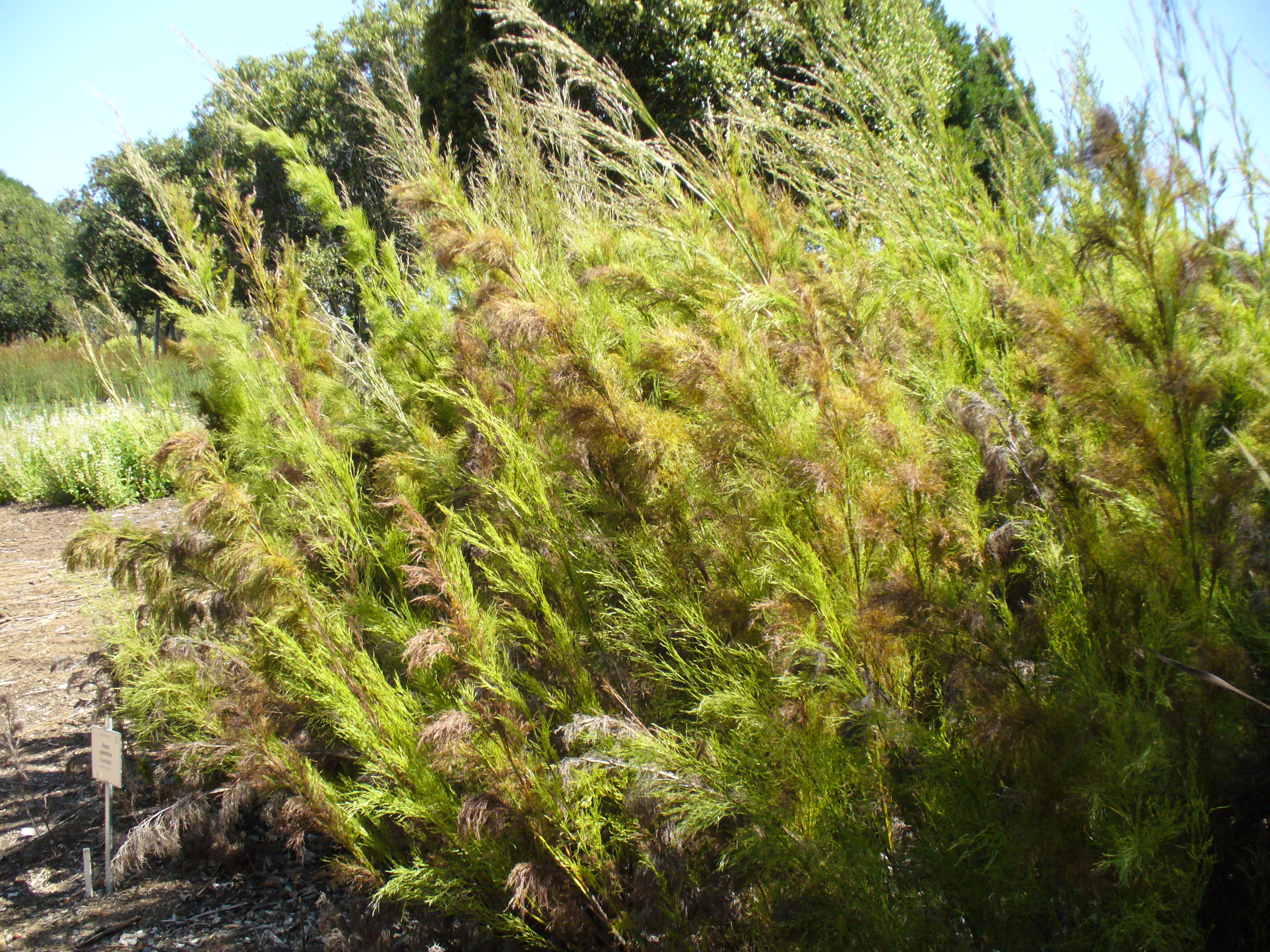
- Restio quadratus

Scientific classification
- Kingdom: Plantae
- Clade: Tracheophytes
- Clade: Angiosperms
- Clade: Monocots
- Clade: Commelinids
- Order: Poales
- Family: Restionaceae
- Genus: Restio; Rottb. 1772 conserved name, not L. 1767

Type species
- Restio dichotomus Rottb.

Synonyms
- Calopsis P.Beauv. ex Desv.; Craspedolepis Steud.; Ischyrolepis Steud.; Leiena Raf.; Restio L., rejected name

= Restio =

Genus of flowering plants

Restio is a genus of flowering plants within the family Restionaceae, described in 1772. The entire genus is endemic to the Cape Provinces and KwaZulu-Natal in South Africa.

In common with a number of other genera in the Restionaceae, restios are widely cultivated for use as garden ornamentals for their attractive nodular foliage. They are mildly frost hardy.

== Species ==
168 species are accepted.

- Restio acockii Pillans
- Restio adpressus (Esterh.) H.P.Linder & C.R.Hardy
- Restio affinis (Esterh.) H.P.Linder & C.R.Hardy
- Restio albotuberculatus H.P.Linder & C.R.Hardy
- Restio alticola Pillans
- Restio andreaeanus (Pillans) H.P.Linder & C.R.Hardy
- Restio anomalus H.P.Linder
- Restio arcuatus Mast.
- Restio aridus Pillans
- Restio asperus (Mast.) H.P.Linder & C.R.Hardy
- Restio aureolus Pillans
- Restio bifarius Mast.
- Restio bifidus Thunb.
- Restio bifurcus Nees ex Mast.
- Restio bolusii Pillans
- Restio brachiatus (Mast.) Pillans
- Restio brunneus Pillans
- Restio burchellii Pillans
- Restio caespitosus (Esterh.) H.P.Linder & C.R.Hardy
- Restio calcicola H.P.Linder & C.R.Hardy
- Restio capensis (L.) H.P.Linder & C.R.Hardy
- Restio capillaris Kunth
- Restio cedarbergensis H.P.Linder
- Restio cincinnatus Mast.
- Restio clandestinus (Esterh.) H.P.Linder & C.R.Hardy
- Restio coactilis Mast.
- Restio colliculospermus H.P.Linder
- Restio communis Pillans
- Restio confusus Pillans
- Restio constipatus H.P.Linder
- Restio corneolus Esterh.
- Restio curvibracteatus (Esterh.) H.P.Linder & C.R.Hardy
- Restio curviramis Kunth
- Restio cymosus (Mast.) Pillans
- Restio debilis Nees
- Restio decipiens (N.E.Br.) H.P.Linder
- Restio degenerans Pillans
- Restio dispar Mast.
- Restio distans Pillans
- Restio distichus Rottb.
- Restio distractus Mast.
- Restio distylis H.P.Linder & C.R.Hardy
- Restio dodii Pillans
- Restio durus (Esterh.) H.P.Linder & C.R.Hardy
- Restio duthieae Pillans
- Restio echinatus Kunth
- Restio egregius Hochst.
- Restio ejuncidus Mast.
- Restio eleocharis Nees ex Mast.
- Restio elsieae H.P.Linder
- Restio esterhuyseniae Pillans
- Restio exilis Mast.
- Restio femineus (Esterh.) H.P.Linder & C.R.Hardy
- Restio festuciformis Nees ex Mast.
- Restio filicaulis Pillans
- Restio filiformis Poir.
- Restio fourcadei Pillans
- Restio fragilis Esterh.
- Restio fraternus Kunth
- Restio fuscidulus Pillans
- Restio fusiformis Pillans
- Restio gaudichaudianus Kunth
- Restio gossypinus Mast.
- Restio harveyi Mast.
- Restio helenae Mast.
- Restio hyalinus (Mast.) H.P.Linder & C.R.Hardy
- Restio hystrix Mast.
- Restio implicatus Esterh.
- Restio impolitus Kunth
- Restio inconspicuus Esterh.
- Restio ingens Esterh.
- Restio insignis Pillans
- Restio inveteratus Esterh.
- Restio involutus Pillans
- Restio karooicus (Esterh.) H.P.Linder & C.R.Hardy
- Restio laniger Kunth
- Restio leptoclados Mast.
- Restio leptostachyus Kunth
- Restio levynsiae (Pillans) H.P.Linder & C.R.Hardy
- Restio longiaristatus (Pillans ex H.P.Linder) H.P.Linder & C.R.Hardy
- Restio luxurians (Pillans) H.P.Linder & C.R.Hardy
- Restio macer Kunth
- Restio marlothii Pillans
- Restio micans Nees
- Restio miser Kunth
- Restio mkambatiae H.P.Linder
- Restio monanthos Mast.
- Restio monostylis (Pillans) H.P.Linder & C.R.Hardy
- Restio montanus Esterh.
- Restio muirii (Pillans) H.P.Linder & C.R.Hardy
- Restio multiflorus Spreng.
- Restio nanus (Esterh.) H.P.Linder & C.R.Hardy
- Restio nodosus Pillans
- Restio nubigenus (Esterh.) H.P.Linder & C.R.Hardy
- Restio nudiflorus (Pillans) H.P.Linder & C.R.Hardy
- Restio nuwebergensis Esterh.
- Restio obscurus Pillans
- Restio occultus (Mast.) Pillans
- Restio ocreatus Kunth
- Restio pachystachyus Kunth
- Restio paludicola H.P.Linder
- Restio paludosus Pillans
- Restio paniculatus Rottb.
- Restio papillosus (Esterh.) H.P.Linder & C.R.Hardy
- Restio papyraceus Pillans
- Restio parthenocarpos H.P.Linder
- Restio parvispiculus H.P.Linder & C.R.Hardy
- Restio patens Mast.
- Restio peculiaris Esterh.
- Restio pedicellatus Mast.
- Restio perplexus Kunth
- Restio perseverans Esterh.
- Restio pillansii H.P.Linder
- Restio praeacutus Mast.
- Restio pratensis (Esterh.) H.P.Linder & C.R.Hardy
- Restio pulcher (Esterh.) H.P.Linder & C.R.Hardy
- Restio pulvinatus Esterh.
- Restio pumilus Esterh.
- Restio purpurascens Nees ex Mast.
- Restio pygmaeus Pillans
- Restio quadratus Mast.
- Restio quinquefarius Nees
- Restio ramosissimus H.P.Linder & C.R.Hardy
- Restio rarus Esterh.
- Restio rigidus (Mast.) H.P.Linder & C.R.Hardy
- Restio rigoratus (Mast.) H.P.Linder & C.R.Hardy
- Restio rivulus (Esterh.) H.P.Linder & C.R.Hardy
- Restio rottboellioides Kunth
- Restio rudolfii H.P.Linder & C.R.Hardy
- Restio rupicola Esterh.
- Restio sabulosus Pillans
- Restio saroclados Mast.
- Restio saxatilis (Esterh.) H.P.Linder & C.R.Hardy
- Restio scaber Mast.
- Restio scaberulus N.E.Br.
- Restio schoenoides Kunth
- Restio secundus (Pillans) H.P.Linder
- Restio sejunctus Mast.
- Restio setiger Kunth
- Restio sieberi Kunth
- Restio similis Pillans
- Restio singularis Esterh.
- Restio sporadicus (Esterh.) H.P.Linder & C.R.Hardy
- Restio stereocaulis Mast.
- Restio stokoei Pillans
- Restio strictus N.E.Br.
- Restio strobilifer Kunth
- Restio subtilis Nees ex Mast.
- Restio subverticillatus (Steud.) Mast.
- Restio tenuispicatus H.P.Linder & C.R.Hardy
- Restio tenuissimus Kunt
- Restio tetragonus Thunb.
- Restio triflorus Rottb.
- Restio triticeus Rottb.
- Restio tuberculatus Pillans
- Restio uniflorus H.P.Linder
- Restio unispicatus (H.P.Linder) H.P.Linder & C.R.Hardy
- Restio vallis-simius H.P.Linder
- Restio verrucosus Esterh.
- Restio versatilis H.P.Linder
- Restio vilis Kunth
- Restio villosus H.P.Linder & C.R.Hardy
- Restio vimineus Rottb.
- Restio virgeus Mast.
- Restio wallichii Mast.
- Restio wittebergensis (Esterh.) H.P.Linder & C.R.Hardy
- Restio zuluensis H.P.Linder
- Restio zwartbergensis Pillans

Many species formerly included within the genus Restio are now classified into a number of other genera including Acion, Baloskion, and Eurychorda.
