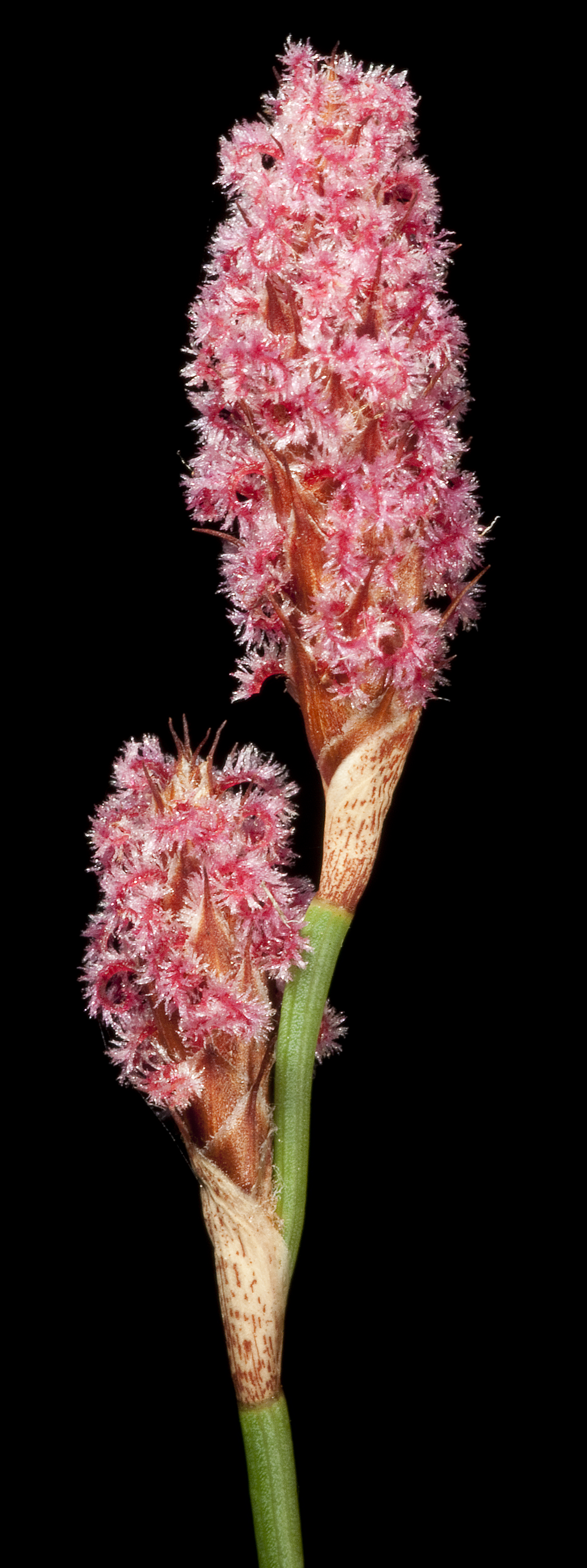
- Dielsia stenostachya

Scientific classification
- Kingdom: Plantae
- Clade: Tracheophytes
- Clade: Angiosperms
- Clade: Monocots
- Clade: Commelinids
- Order: Poales
- Family: Restionaceae
- Genus: Dielsia; Gilg
- Species: D. stenostachya

Binomial name
- Dielsia stenostachya (W.Fitzg.) B.G.Briggs & L.A.S.Johnson

Synonyms
- Restio stenostachyus W.Fitzg.; Dielsia cygnorum Gilg

= Dielsia =

Genus of flowering plants

Dielsia is a genus of flowering plant, described in 1904, in the family Restionaceae. There is only one known species, Dielsia stenostachya, endemic to Southwest Australia.

Species in homonymic genus

In 1929, Kudô used the name Dielsia in reference to a plant in the Lamiaceae, thus creating an illegitimate homonym. He also created one species in his genus, i.e.

- Dielsia oreophila (Diels) Kudô, syn of Isodon oreophilus (Diels) A.J.Paton & Ryding
