= Coleocarya =

Scientific classification
- Kingdom: Plantae
- Clade: Tracheophytes
- Clade: Angiosperms
- Clade: Monocots
- Clade: Commelinids
- Order: Poales
- Family: Restionaceae
- Genus: Coleocarya; S.T.Blake
- Species: C. gracilis

Binomial name
- Coleocarya gracilis S.T.Blake

Genus of flowering plants

Coleocarya is a group of plants in the Restionaceae described as a genus in 1943. There is only one known species, Coleocarya gracilis, endemic to Australia (New South Wales and southeastern Queensland).
