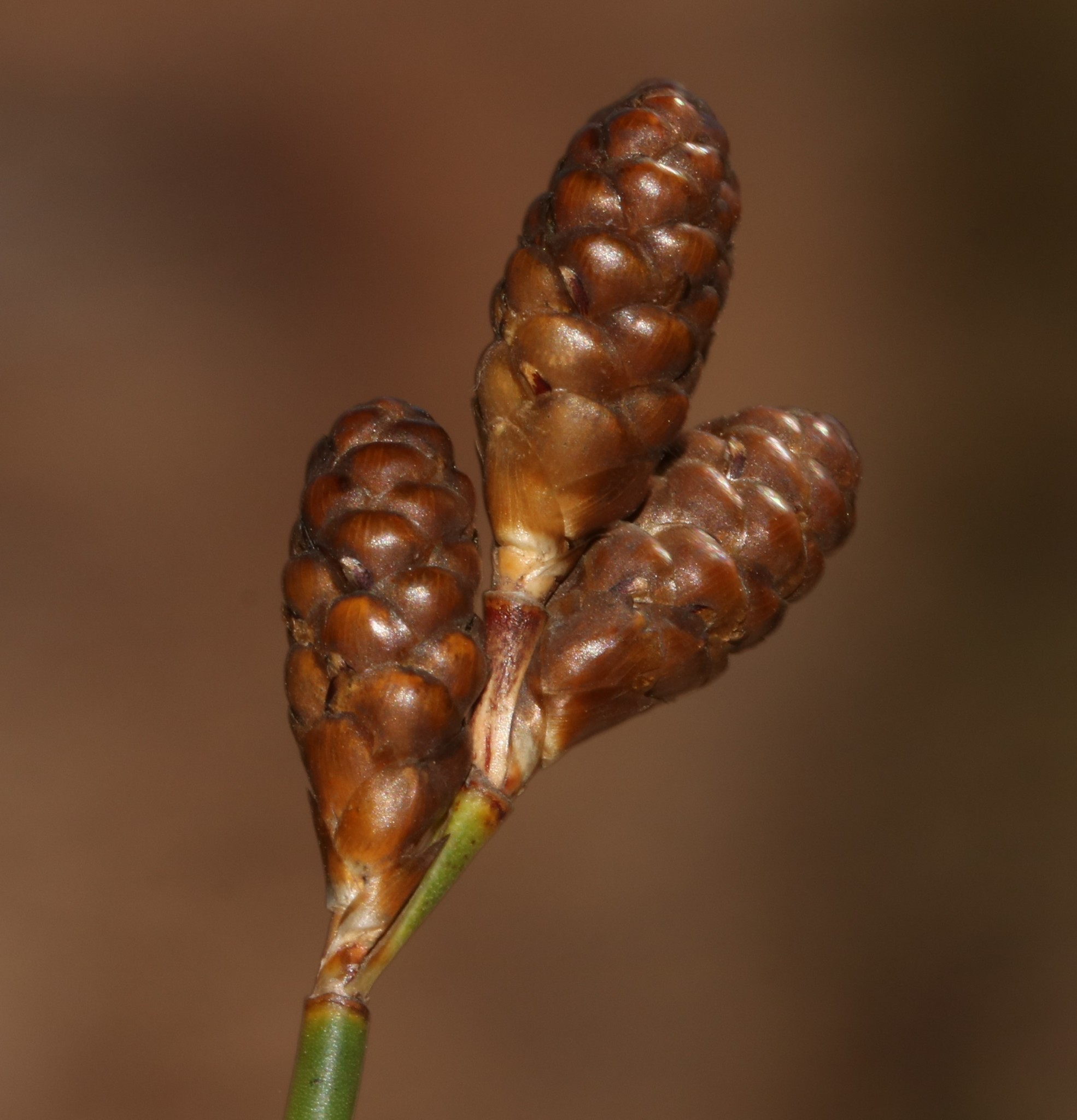
- Round conereed (Nevillea obtusissima)

Scientific classification
- Kingdom: Plantae
- Clade: Tracheophytes
- Clade: Angiosperms
- Clade: Monocots
- Clade: Commelinids
- Order: Poales
- Family: Restionaceae
- Genus: Nevillea; Esterh. & H.P.Linder

Type species
- Nevillea obtusissimus (Steud.) H.P.Linder

= Nevillea =

Genus of flowering plants

Nevillea, the conereeds, is a group of plants in the Restionaceae described as a genus in 1984. The entire genus is endemic to the Western Cape in South Africa.

== Species ==
- Round Conereed - Nevillea obtusissimus (Steud.) H.P.Linder
- Kanonkop Conereed - Nevillea singularis Esterh.
- Langeberg Conereed - Nevillea vlokii H.P.Linder
