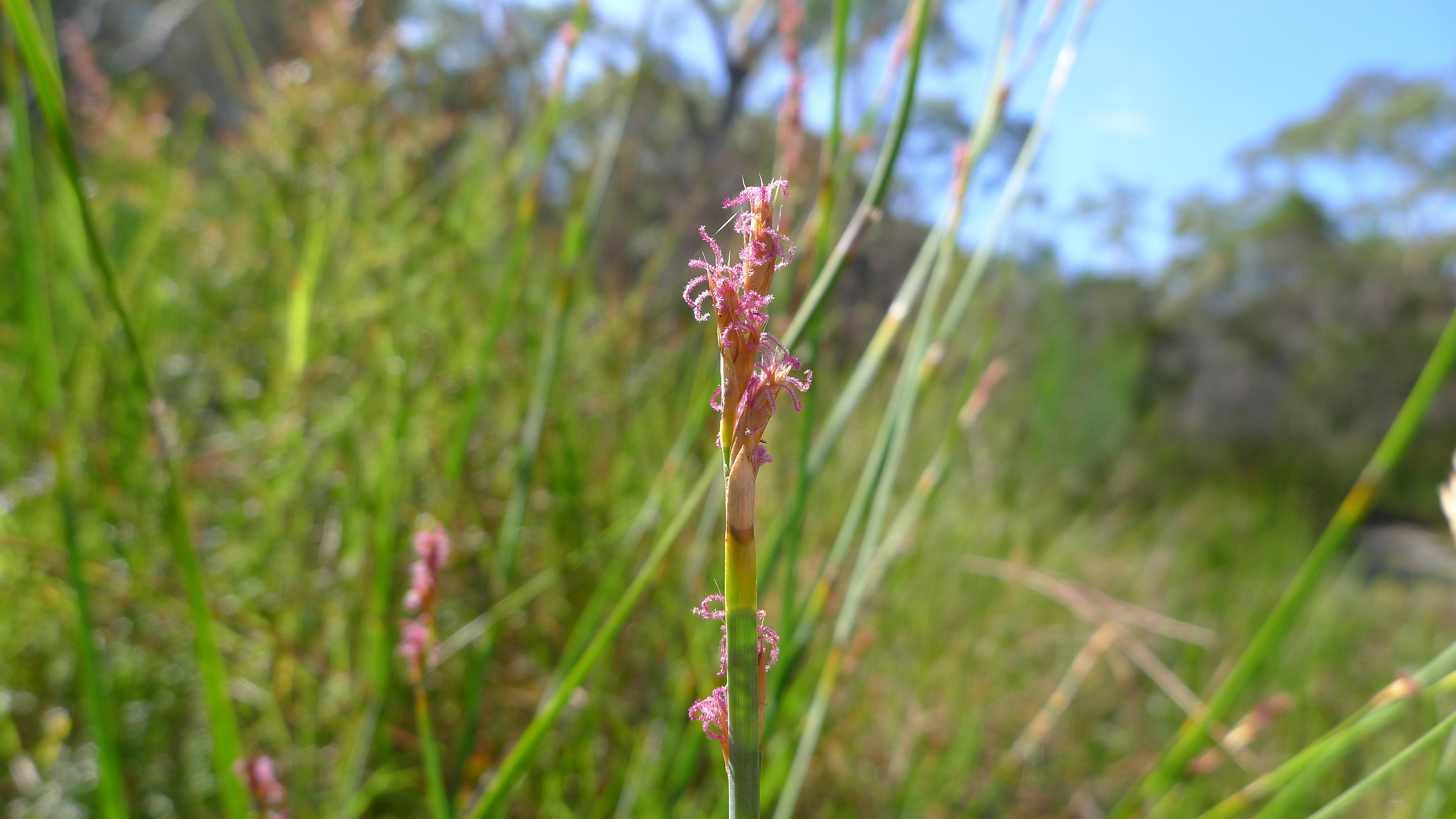

Scientific classification
- Kingdom: Plantae
- Clade: Tracheophytes
- Clade: Angiosperms
- Clade: Monocots
- Clade: Commelinids
- Order: Poales
- Family: Restionaceae
- Genus: Eurychorda; B.G.Briggs & L.A.S.Johnson
- Species: E. complanata

Binomial name
- Eurychorda complanata (R.Br.) B.G.Briggs & L.A.S.Johnson

Synonyms
- Restio complanatus R.Br.

= Eurychorda =

Genus of flowering plants

Eurychorda is a monotypic genus of flowering plants in the family Restionaceae formally described in 1998. The only known species, Eurychorda complanata, commonly known as the flat cord-rush, is endemic to Australia. It is characterised by flattened stems and reduced, sheathing leaves.

== Description ==
A perennial or rhizomatous geophyte herb, Eurychorda complanata exhibits a graminoid growth form with tufted or shortly creeping rhizomes, and erect culms ranging from 20–120 cm (7.9–47.2 in) in height and 0.8–3.5 mm (0.031–0.138 in) in diameter. Leaves are reduced pale, glabrous sheaths along the stem with acute apices, approximately 10–25 mm (0.39–0.98 in) long. It has terminal inflorescences of spikelets, typically 5-20, arranged in a narrow panicle with shorter bracts. E. complanata is dioecious. Male spikelets are ovate to globose, about 6–9 mm (0.24–0.35 in) long, with many flowers, while female spikelets are elliptic, approximately 6.5–9 mm (0.26–0.35 in) long, usually pedicellate, and have fewer flowers. Both male and female flowers possess four tepals. It flowers in summer (November, December, January, February) and has dry dehiscent capsule fruit.

== Habitat and distribution ==
Eurychorda complanata thrives in waterlogged peaty vegetation from sea level to sub-alpine areas and is a common species in button grass sedgeland communities. It is common in Tasmania but its distribution extends across south-eastern Australia (Tasmania, Victoria, New South Wales, Queensland, South Australia).

== Taxonomy ==
Eurychorda complanata belongs to the family Restionaceae within the order Poales. It was first identified in 1810 by Robert Brown in Prodromus Florae Novae Hollandiae. The species was then formally described and named in 1998 by Barbara Gillian Briggs & Lawrence Alexander Sidney Johnson. The specific epiphet 'complanata' signifies its flattened morphology.

== Threats and conservation ==
This species is rare in South Australia and listed as vulnerable due to habitat loss and degradation. It is not listed as a threatened species elsewhere in its distribution.
