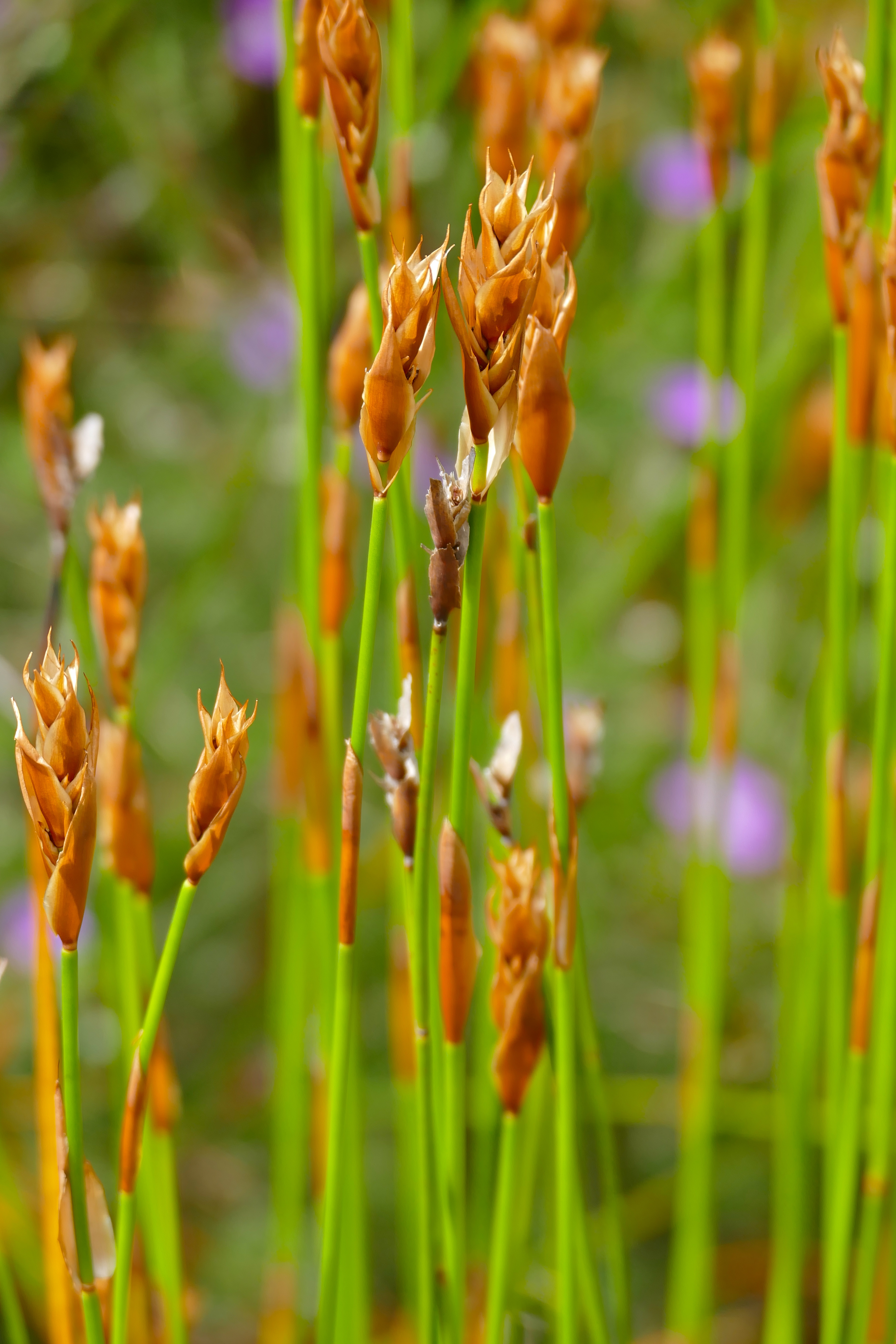
- Askidiosperma andreaeanum

Scientific classification
- Kingdom: Plantae
- Clade: Tracheophytes
- Clade: Angiosperms
- Clade: Monocots
- Clade: Commelinids
- Order: Poales
- Family: Restionaceae
- Genus: Askidiosperma; Steud.

Type species
- Askidiosperma capitatum Steud.

Synonyms
- Askidosperma Steud.

= Askidiosperma =

Genus of flowering plants

Askidiosperma is a group of plants in the Restionaceae described as a genus in 1850. The entire genus is endemic to Cape Province in South Africa.

Species

- Askidiosperma alboaristatum (Pillans) H.Linder
- Askidiosperma alticola (E.Esterhuysen) H.P.Linder
- Askidiosperma andreaeanum (Pillans) H.Linder
- Askidiosperma capitatum Steud.
- Askidiosperma chartaceum (Pillans) H.Linder
- Askidiosperma delicatulum H.P.Linder
- Askidiosperma esterhuyseniae (Pillans) H.Linder
- Askidiosperma insigne (Pillans) H.Linder
- Askidiosperma longiflorum (Pillans) H.Linder
- Askidiosperma nitidum (Mast.) H.Linder
- Askidiosperma paniculatum (Mast.) H.Linder
- Askidiosperma rugosum E.Esterhuysen
