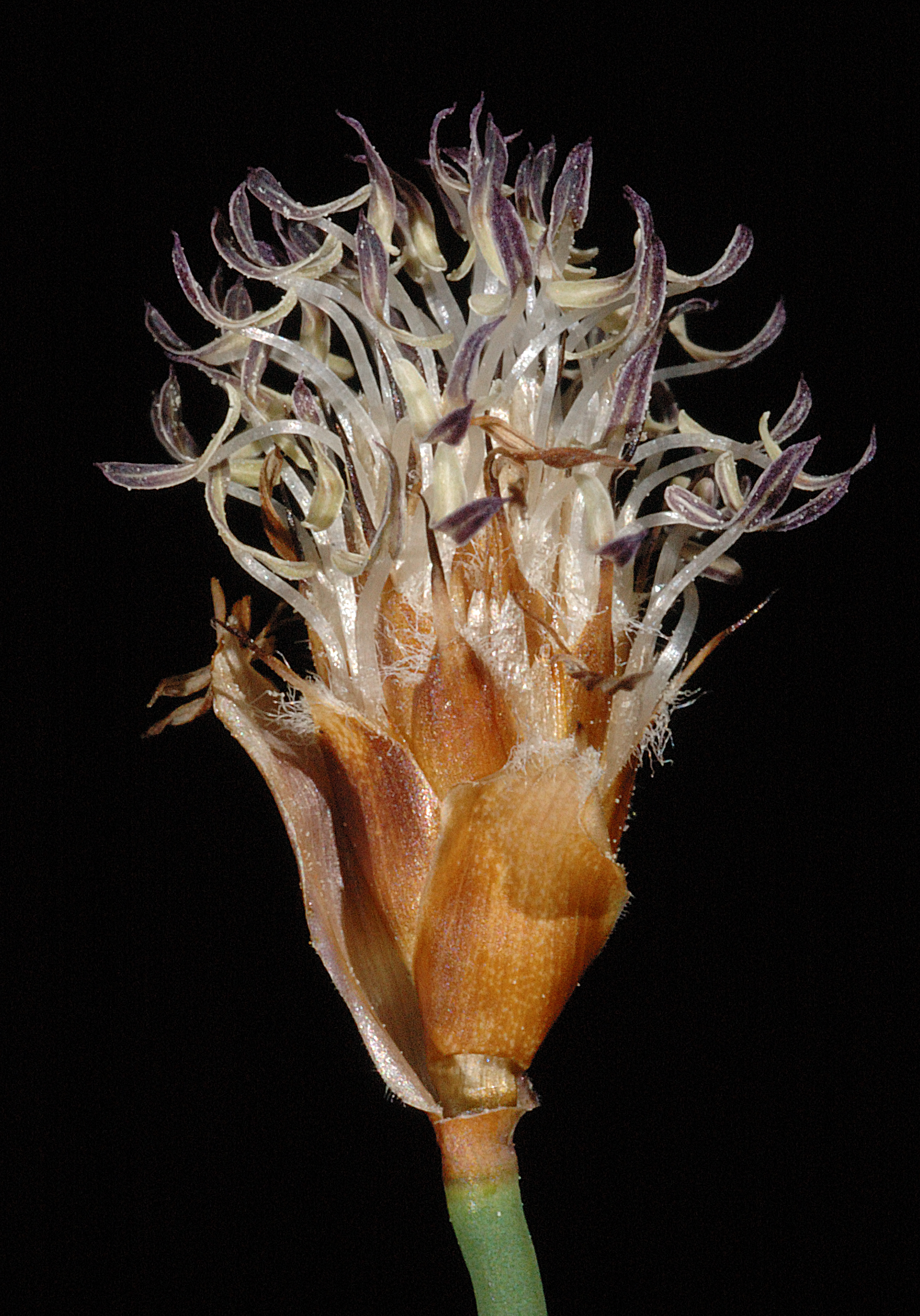
- Lepidobolus preissianus

Scientific classification
- Kingdom: Plantae
- Clade: Tracheophytes
- Clade: Angiosperms
- Clade: Monocots
- Clade: Commelinids
- Order: Poales
- Family: Restionaceae
- Genus: Lepidobolus; Nees

Type species
- Lepidobolus preissianus Nees

= Lepidobolus =

Genus of grasses

Lepidobolus is a plant genus in the family Restionaceae, described as a genus in 1846. The entire genus is endemic to Australia.

Species

- Lepidobolus basiflorus Pate & Meney - WA
- Lepidobolus chaetocephalus F.Muell. - WA
- Lepidobolus deserti Gilg ex Diels & Pritz. - WA
- Lepidobolus eurardyensis K.W.Dixon & B.G.Briggs - WA
- Lepidobolus drapetocoleus F.Muell. - SA, Vic
- Lepidobolus preissianus Nees - WA
- Lepidobolus spiralis Meney & K.W.Dixon - WA
