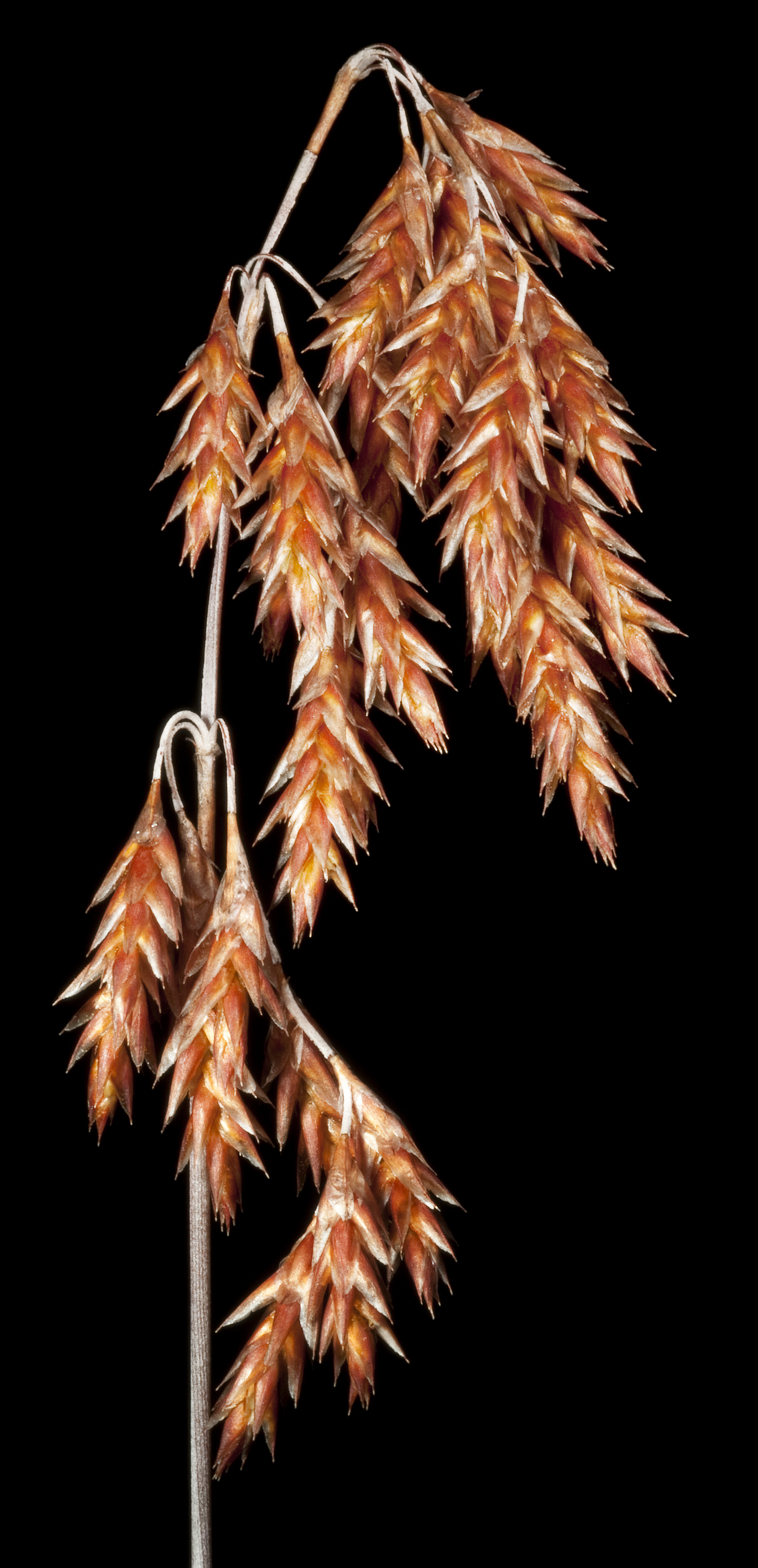
- Chaetanthus aristatus (male)

Scientific classification
- Kingdom: Plantae
- Clade: Tracheophytes
- Clade: Angiosperms
- Clade: Monocots
- Clade: Commelinids
- Order: Poales
- Family: Restionaceae
- Genus: Chaetanthus; R. Br.

Type species
- Chaetanthus leptocarpoides R. Br.

Synonyms
- Prionosepalum Steud.

= Chaetanthus =

Genus of flowering plants

Chaetanthus is a group of plants in the Restionaceae described as a genus in 1810. The entire genus is endemic to the southern part of Western Australia.

Species

- Chaetanthus aristatus (R.Br.) B.G.Briggs & L.A.S.Johnson
- Chaetanthus leptocarpoides R.Br.
- Chaetanthus tenellus (Nees) B.G.Briggs & L.A.S.Johnson
