= Dielsiocharis =

Scientific classification
- Kingdom: Plantae
- Clade: Tracheophytes
- Clade: Angiosperms
- Clade: Eudicots
- Clade: Rosids
- Order: Brassicales
- Family: Brassicaceae
- Genus: Dielsiocharis; O.E.Schulz

Genus of plants

Dielsiocharis is a genus of flowering plants belonging to the family Brassicaceae.

Its native range is Southern Turkmenistan to Iran.

The genus name of Dielsiocharis is a compound, combining Diels from a German botanist Ludwig Diels (1874–1945), and also Charis, a Greek goddess of charm, beauty.

Known species:

- Dielsiocharis bactriana (Ovcz. & Junussov) Al-Shehbaz & Junussov
- Dielsiocharis kotschyi (Boiss.) O.E.Schulz
