= Hydrophilus rattrayi =

Scientific classification
- Kingdom: Plantae
- Clade: Tracheophytes
- Clade: Angiosperms
- Clade: Monocots
- Clade: Commelinids
- Order: Poales
- Family: Restionaceae
- Genus: Hydrophilus; H.P.Linder
- Species: H. rattrayi

Binomial name
- Hydrophilus rattrayi (Pillans) H.P.Linder

Synonyms
- Leptocarpus rattrayi Pillans

Species of flowering plant

Hydrophilus is a group of plants in the Restionaceae described as a genus in 1984.

There is only one known species, Hydrophilus rattrayi, endemic to Cape Province in South Africa.
