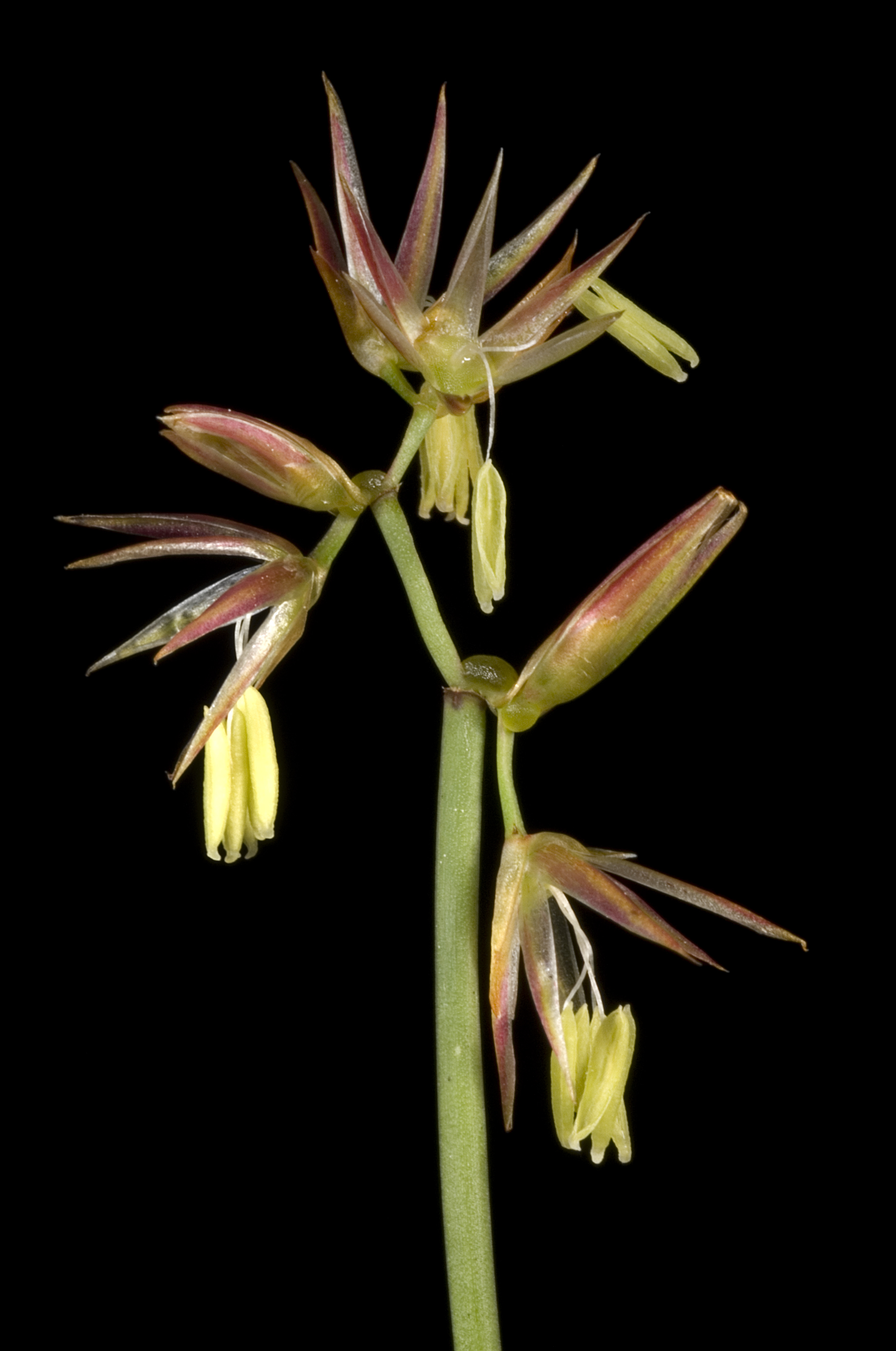
- Anarthria prolifera

Scientific classification
- Kingdom: Plantae
- Clade: Tracheophytes
- Clade: Angiosperms
- Clade: Monocots
- Clade: Commelinids
- Order: Poales
- Family: Restionaceae
- Genus: Anarthria; R.Br. 1810

= Anarthria =

Genus of flowering plants

Anarthria is a genus of flowering plant species endemic to Southwest Australia. The name of the genus is derived from Ancient Greek, meaning 'without joints'.

Species

- Anarthria gracilis R.Br.
- Anarthria humilis Nees
- Anarthria laevis R.Br
- Anarthria polyphylla Nees
- Anarthria prolifera R.Br
- Anarthria scabra R.Br
