= Mastersiella =

Scientific classification
- Kingdom: Plantae
- Clade: Tracheophytes
- Clade: Angiosperms
- Clade: Monocots
- Clade: Commelinids
- Order: Poales
- Family: Restionaceae
- Genus: Mastersiella; Gilg-Ben.

Type species
- Mastersiella digitata (Thunb.) Gilg-Ben.

Genus of flowering plants

Mastersiella is a group of plants in the Restionaceae described as a genus in 1930.

The entire genus is endemic to Cape Province in South Africa.

Species

- Mastersiella digitata (Thunb.) Gilg-Ben.
- Mastersiella purpurea (Pillans) H.P.Linder
- Mastersiella spathulata (Pillans) H.P.Linder
