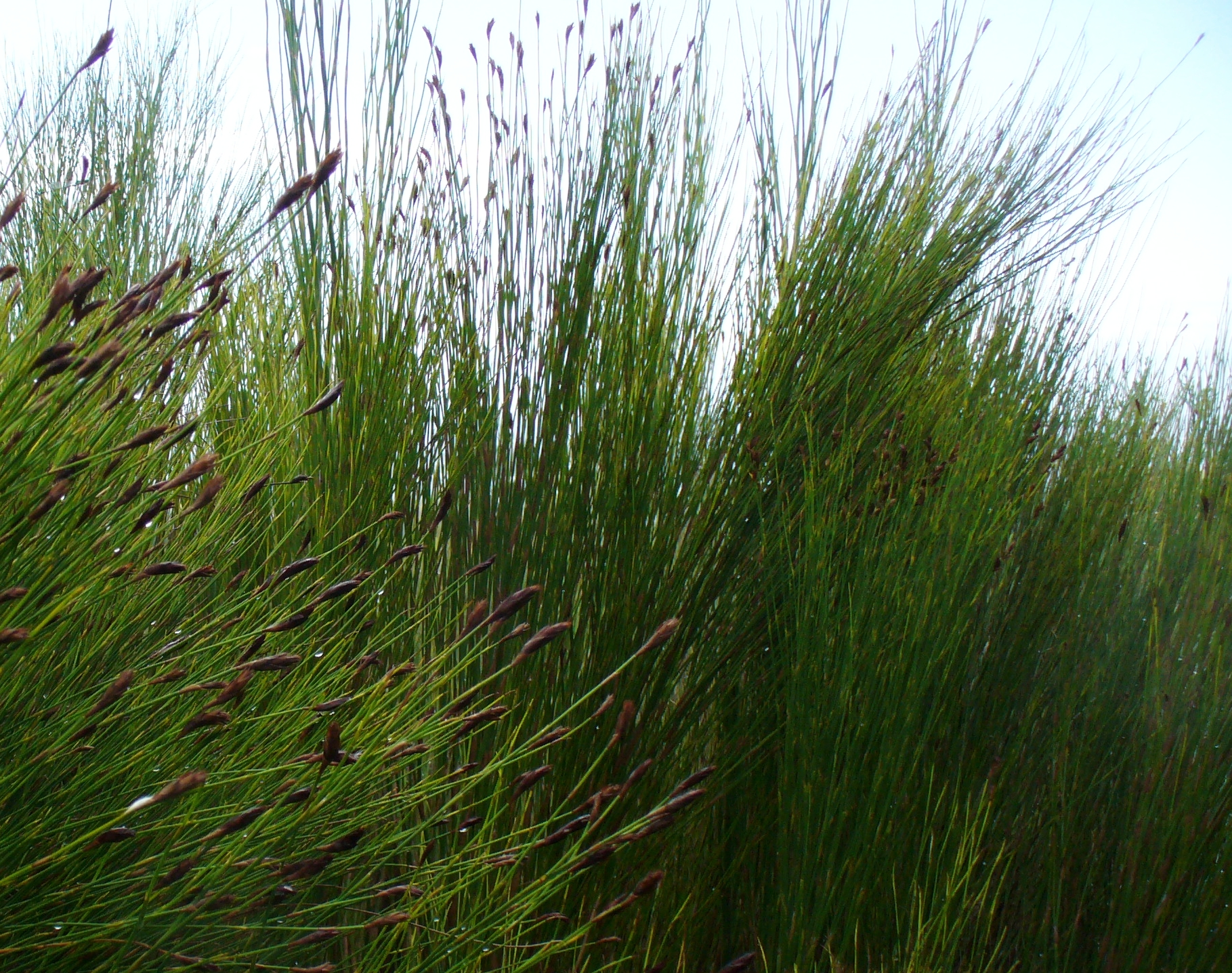
- Platycaulos callistachyus

Scientific classification
- Kingdom: Plantae
- Clade: Tracheophytes
- Clade: Angiosperms
- Clade: Monocots
- Clade: Commelinids
- Order: Poales
- Family: Restionaceae
- Genus: Platycaulos; H.P.Linder

Type species
- Platycaulos compressus (Rottb.) H.P.Linder

= Platycaulos =

Genus of flowering plants

Platycaulos is a group of plants in the Restionaceae described as a genus in 1984. The genus is native to eastern and southern Africa including Madagascar.

== Species ==
12 species are accepted.

- Platycaulos acutus Esterh. – Cape Provinces
- Platycaulos anceps (Mast.) H.P.Linder – Cape Provinces
- Platycaulos callistachyus (Kunth) H.P.Linder – Cape Provinces
- Platycaulos cascadensis (Pillans) H.P.Linder – Cape Provinces
- Platycaulos compressus (Rottb.) H.P.Linder – Cape Provinces
- Platycaulos depauperatus (Kunth) H.P.Linder – Cape Provinces
- Platycaulos galpinii (Pillans) H.P.Linder & C.R.Hardy – Cape Provinces, KwaZulu-Natal
- Platycaulos mahonii (N.E.Br.) H.P.Linder & C.R.Hardy – Democratic Republic of the Congo, Tanzania, Malawi, Mozambique, Madagascar
- Platycaulos major (Mast.) H.P.Linder – Cape Provinces
- Platycaulos mlanjiensis (H.P.Linder) H.P.Linder & C.R.Hardy – Malawi
- Platycaulos quartziticola (H.P.Linder) H.P.Linder & C.R.Hardy – Zimbabwe, Mozambique
- Platycaulos subcompressus (Pillans) H.P.Linder – Cape Provinces
