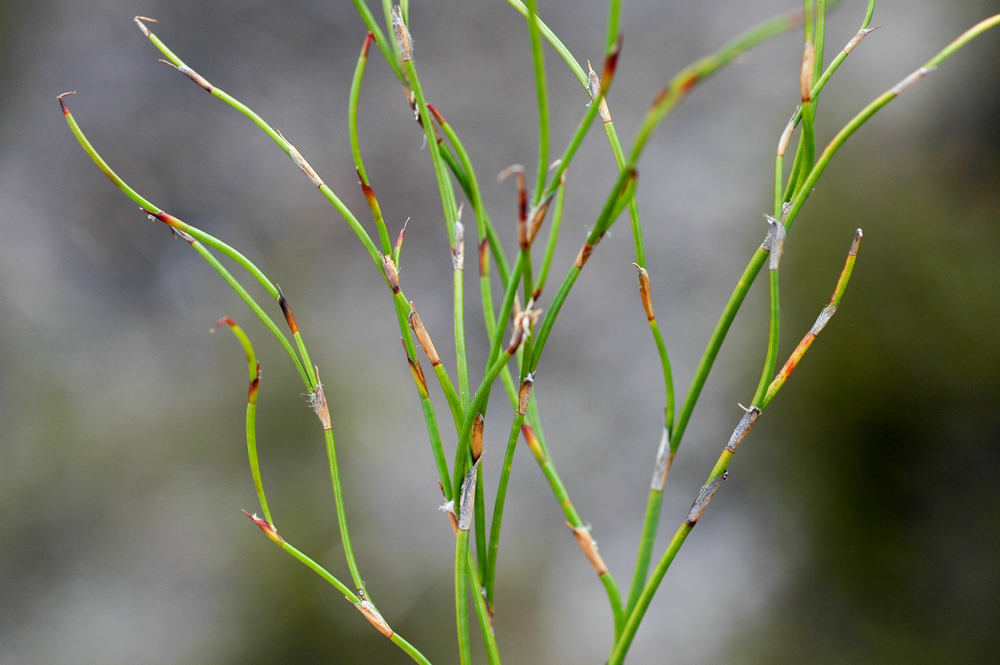
- E. minus

Scientific classification
- Kingdom: Plantae
- Clade: Tracheophytes
- Clade: Angiosperms
- Clade: Monocots
- Clade: Commelinids
- Order: Poales
- Family: Restionaceae
- Genus: Empodisma; L.A.S.Johnson & D.F.Cutler

= Empodisma =

Genus of flowering plants

Empodisma is a genus of herbaceous rush-like plants in the family Restionaceae first described in 1974. It is native to Australia and New Zealand.

species

- Empodisma gracillimum (F.Muell.) L.A.S.Johnson & D.F.Cutler - Western Australia
- Empodisma minus (Hook.f.) L.A.S.Johnson & D.F.Cutler - Queensland, New South Wales, Victoria, Tasmania, South Australia, North Island of New Zealand
- Empodisma robustum Wagstaff & B.R.Clarkson - North Island of New Zealand
