= Hopkinsia =

Scientific classification
- Kingdom: Plantae
- Clade: Tracheophytes
- Clade: Angiosperms
- Clade: Monocots
- Clade: Commelinids
- Order: Poales
- Family: Restionaceae
- Genus: Hopkinsia; W.Fitzg.

Type species
- Hopkinsia scabrida (syn of H. anoectocolea) W.Fitzg.

Genus of flowering plants

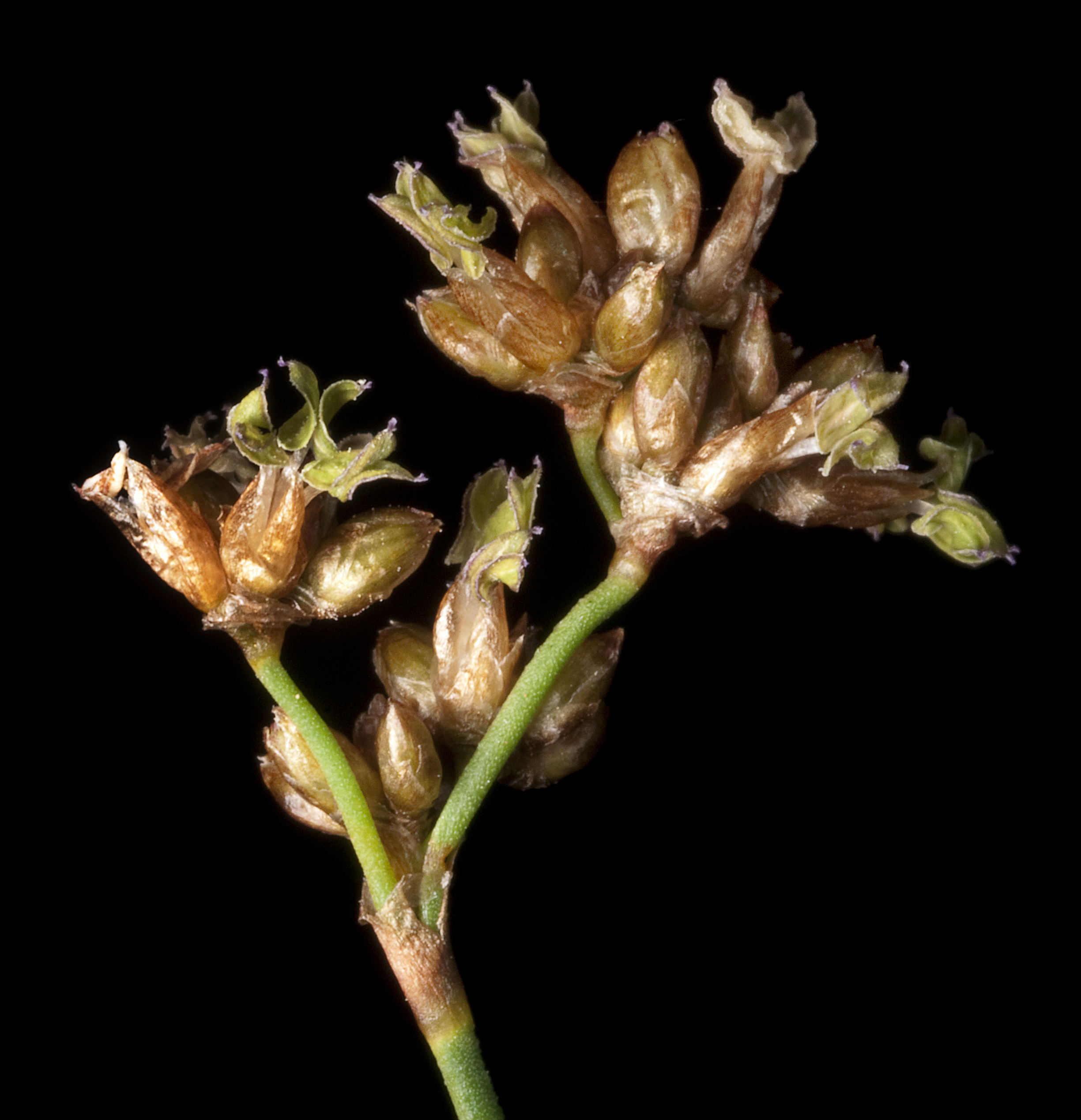
Hopkinsia plant

Hopkinsia is a genus of plants in the family Restionaceae, first described as a genus in 1904. The entire group is endemic to southwestern Australia.

Two species are accepted.

- Hopkinsia adscendens B.G.Briggs & L.A.S.Johnson
- Hopkinsia anoectocolea (F.Muell.) D.F.Cutler
