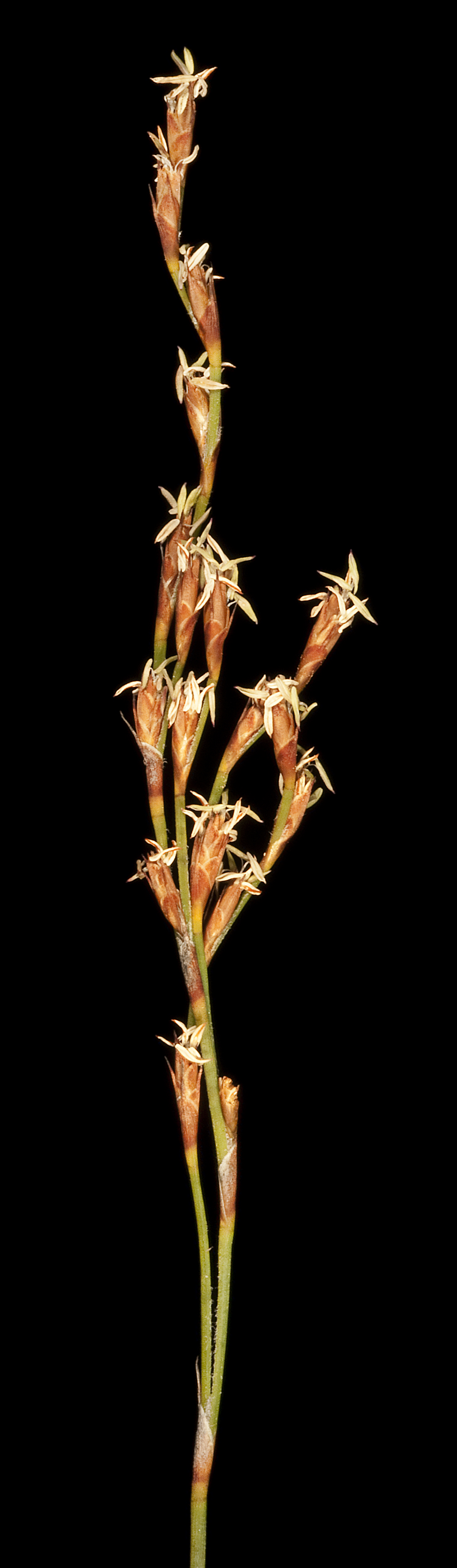
- Loxocarya cinerea

Scientific classification
- Kingdom: Plantae
- Clade: Tracheophytes
- Clade: Angiosperms
- Clade: Monocots
- Clade: Commelinids
- Order: Poales
- Family: Restionaceae
- Genus: Loxocarya; R.Br.

Synonyms
- Haplostigma F.Muell.; Megalotheca F.Muell.

= Loxocarya =

Genus of flowering plants

Loxocarya is a plant genus in the family Restionaceae, described as a genus in 1810. The entire genus is endemic to Southwest Australia.

== Species ==
Five species are accepted.

- Loxocarya albipes Pate & Meney
- Loxocarya cinerea R.Br.
- Loxocarya gigas B.G.Briggs & L.A.S.Johnson
- Loxocarya magna Meney & K.W.Dixon
- Loxocarya striata (F.Muell.) B.G.Briggs & L.A.S.Johnson
