= Anthochortus =

Scientific classification
- Kingdom: Plantae
- Clade: Tracheophytes
- Clade: Angiosperms
- Clade: Monocots
- Clade: Commelinids
- Order: Poales
- Family: Restionaceae
- Genus: Anthochortus; Nees ex Endl.

Type species
- Anthochortus ecklonii Nees

Synonyms
- Antochortus Nees; Phyllocomos Mast.

Genus of flowering plants

Anthochortus is a group of plants in the Restionaceae described as a genus in 1837. The entire genus is endemic to Cape Province in South Africa.

Species

- Anthochortus capensis Esterh.
- Anthochortus crinalis (Mast.) H.P.Linder
- Anthochortus ecklonii Nees
- Anthochortus graminifolius (Kunth) H.P.Linder
- Anthochortus insignis (Mast.) H.P.Linder
- Anthochortus laxiflorus (Nees) H.P.Linder
- Anthochortus singularis Esterh.
