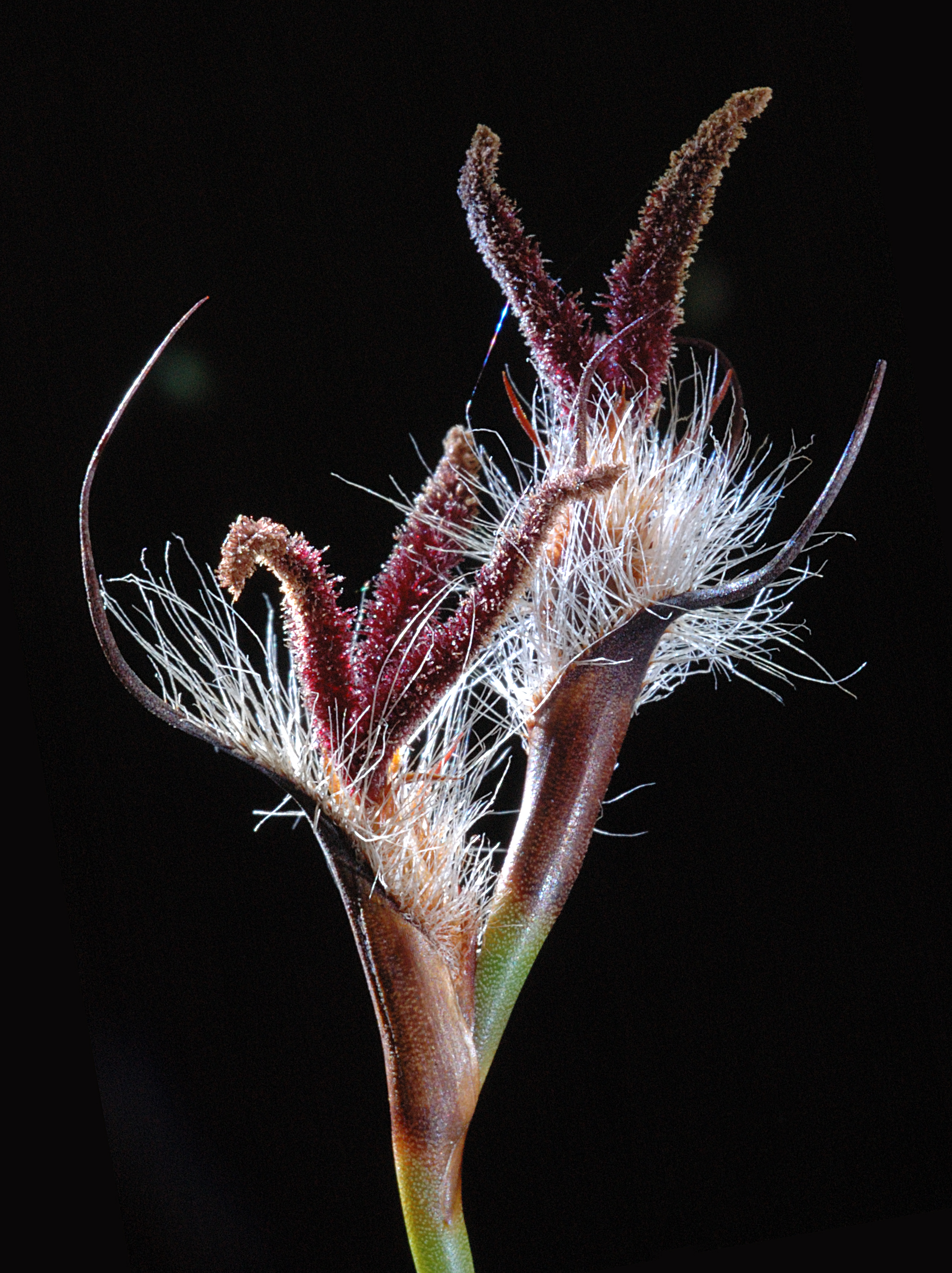
- Lyginia barbata (female)

Scientific classification
- Kingdom: Plantae
- Clade: Tracheophytes
- Clade: Angiosperms
- Clade: Monocots
- Clade: Commelinids
- Order: Poales
- Family: Restionaceae
- Genus: Lyginia; R.Br.

Species
- Lyginia barbata; Lyginia excelsa; Lyginia imberbis

= Lyginia =

Genus of flowering plants

Lyginia is a genus of three rhizomatous plant species all endemic to South Western Australia. They tend to grow in dry, sandy areas.

== Lyginia barbata ==
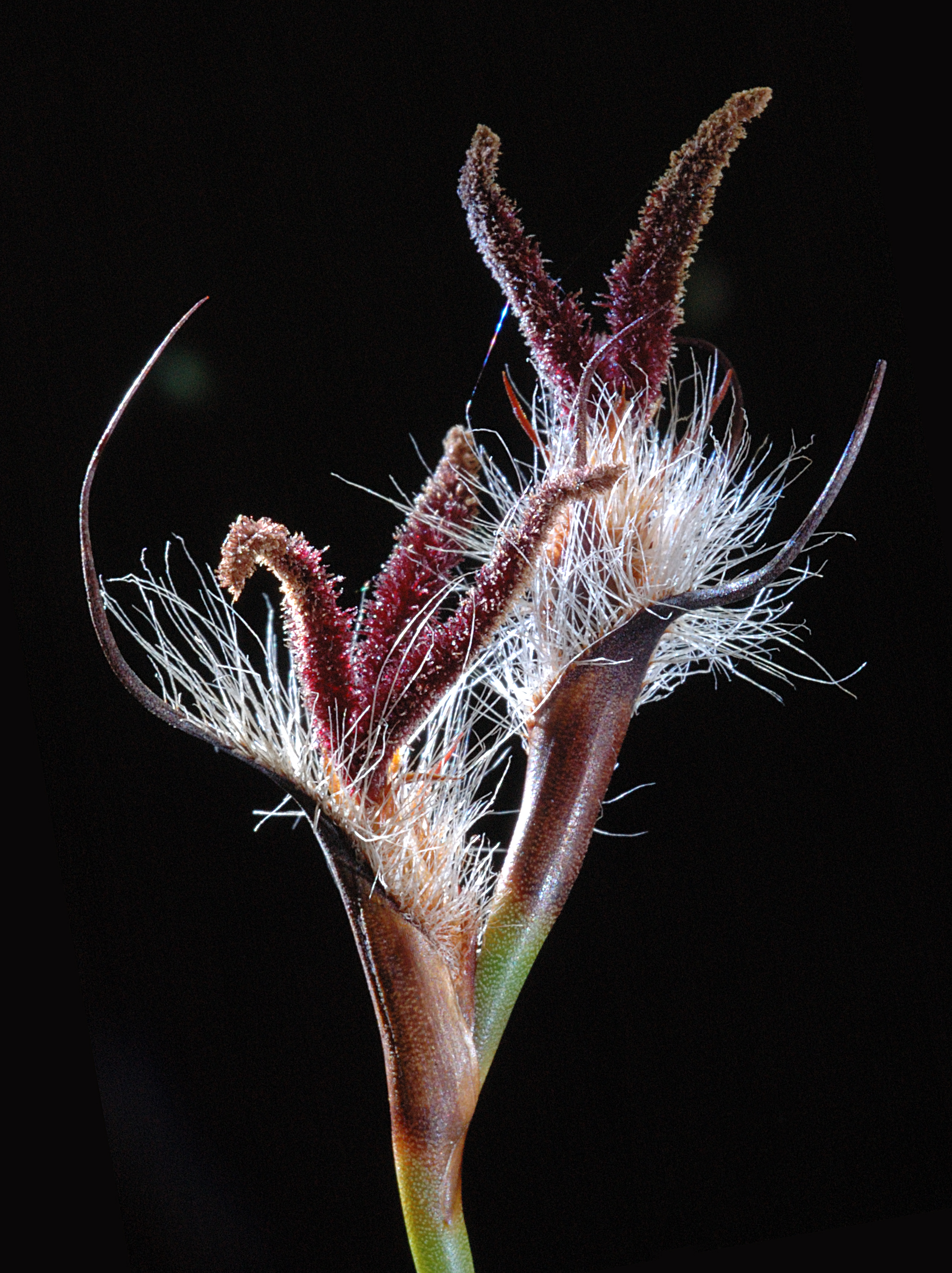
Lyginia barbata (female)

Lyginia barbata is a perennial herb found near Perth, Albany, and Esperance.

== Lyginia excelsa ==
Lyginia excelsa is a Priority One herb found in a few small populations across Western Australia.

== Lyginia imberbis ==
Lyginia imberbis is another perennial herb found all across Southwest Australia.
