= Calorophus =

Scientific classification
- Kingdom: Plantae
- Clade: Tracheophytes
- Clade: Angiosperms
- Clade: Monocots
- Clade: Commelinids
- Order: Poales
- Family: Restionaceae
- Genus: Calorophus; Labill.

Type species
- Calorophus elongata Labill.

Synonyms
- Calostrophus F.Muell., spelling variation

Genus of grasses

Calorophus is a group of plants in the Restionaceae described as a genus in 1806. The entire genus is endemic to Australia, found in the States of Victoria and Tasmania.

Species

- Calorophus elongatus Labill. - Victoria and Tasmania
- Calorophus erostris (C.B.Clarke) L.A.S.Johnson & B.G.Briggs - Tasmania
