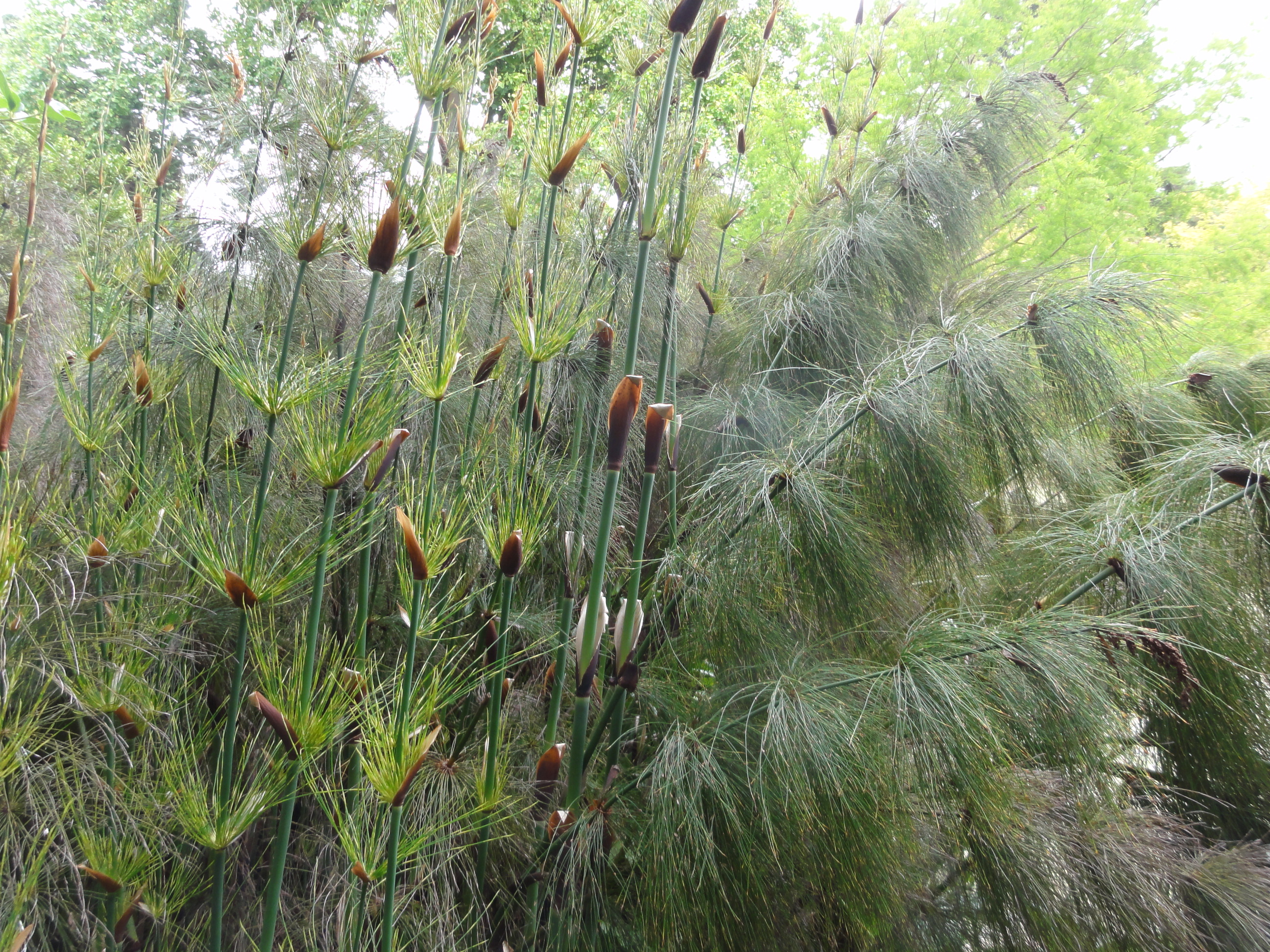
- Elegia capensis

Scientific classification
- Kingdom: Plantae
- Clade: Tracheophytes
- Clade: Angiosperms
- Clade: Monocots
- Clade: Commelinids
- Order: Poales
- Family: Restionaceae; R.Br.

= Restionaceae =

Restionaceae Temporal range: Late Cretaceous-Recent, 66–0 Ma

Family of flowering plants

The Restionaceae, also called restiads and restios, are a family of flowering plants native to the Southern Hemisphere; they vary from a few centimeters to 3 meters in height. Following the APG IV (2016): the family now includes the former families Anarthriaceae, Centrolepidaceae and Lyginiaceae, and as such includes 51 genera with 572 known species. Based on evidence from fossil pollen, the Restionaceae likely originated more than 65 million years ago during the Late Cretaceous period, when the southern continents were still part of Gondwana.

== Description ==
The family consists of tufted or rhizomatous, herbaceous plants belonging to a group of monocotyledons that includes several similar families, such as the sedges, rushes, and grasses. They have green, photosynthetic stems and leaves that have been reduced to sheaths. Their flowers are extremely small and in spikelets, which in turn make up the inflorescences. Male and female flowers are on separate plants and, like grasses, are wind-pollinated.

== Distribution ==
Plants in the family are distributed on all the southern continents - South America (two spp., Apodasmia chilensis and Gaimardia australis), Africa south of the Equator and including Madagascar (about 330 spp.), Australia (about 150 spp.) and New Zealand (four spp.), and widely distributed in Southeast Asia (one sp.).

They are often dominant elements of the flora in the Mediterranean climates of South Africa and Western Australia. They are the defining family in the Western Cape fynbos plant community.

The South American species is very similar to one of the New Zealand species, leading to the conjecture that it might have crossed the Pacific in the last 30 million years.

The distribution of restios in Africa is irregular, with the same single species occurring in Madagascar, the Democratic Republic of the Congo, Tanzania, and Malawi, while a different species is found in the Chimanimani Mountains of eastern Zimbabwe. Four species are found in the Natal Drakensberg, one of which spills over into Mpumalanga and Limpopo provinces. The vast majority of species, though, are to be found in the Cape Floristic Region and particularly plentiful on hard sandstone formations. The center of diversity lies in the Kogelberg, where more than a third of all Restionaceae may be found. Restionaceae are grown in Kirstenbosch, Cape Town's National Botanical Gardens.

A number of the largest African species have become popular as garden ornamentals in many parts of the world, some being useful as accent plants similar to small species of bamboo, but with pendant stems of greater delicacy. Also, many smaller species offer a great variety of decorative features and deserve horticultural attention.

== Taxonomy ==
The family Restionaceae has been recognized by most taxonomists. The APG II system of 2003 (unchanged from the APG system, 1998), recognizes this family and assigns it to the order Poales, in the clade commelinids of the monocots. The Cronquist system of 1981 also recognized this family and placed it in the order Restionales, in the subclass Commelinidae in class Liliopsida in division Magnoliophyta.

=== Genera ===
As of 2020, Kew's Plants of the World Online lists the following 48 genera in the family Restionaceae:

- Alexgeorgea Carlquist
- Anarthria R.Br.
- Anthochortus Nees ex Endl.
- Aphelia R.Br.
- Apodasmia B.G.Briggs & L.A.S.Johnson
- Askidiosperma Steud.
- Baloskion Raf.
- Calorophus Labill.
- Cannomois P.Beauv. ex Desv.
- Catacolea B.G.Briggs & L.A.S.Johnson
- Centrolepis Labill.
- Ceratocaryum Nees
- Chaetanthus R.Br.
- Chordifex B.G.Briggs & L.A.S.Johnson
- Coleocarya S.T.Blake
- Cytogonidium B.G.Briggs & L.A.S.Johnson
- Dapsilanthus B.G.Briggs & L.A.S.Johnson
- Desmocladus Nees
- Dielsia Gilg
- Elegia L.
- Empodisma L.A.S.Johnson & D.F.Cutler
- Eurychorda B.G.Briggs & L.A.S.Johnson
- Gaimardia Gaudich.
- Hopkinsia W.Fitzg.
- Hydrophilus H.P.Linder
- Hypodiscus Nees
- Hypolaena R.Br.
- Lepidobolus Nees
- Leptocarpus R.Br.
- Lepyrodia R.Br.
- Loxocarya R.Br.
- Lyginia R.Br.
- Mastersiella Gilg-Ben.
- Melanostachya B.G.Briggs & L.A.S.Johnson
- Nevillea Esterh. & H.P.Linder
- Platycaulos H.P.Linder
- Platychorda B.G.Briggs & L.A.S.Johnson
- Restio Rottb.
- Rhodocoma Nees
- Soroveta H.P.Linder & C.R.Hardy
- Sporadanthus F.Muell. ex Buchanan
- Staberoha Kunth
- Taraxis B.G.Briggs & L.A.S.Johnson
- Thamnochortus P.J.Bergius
- Tremulina B.G.Briggs & L.A.S.Johnson
- Tyrbastes B.G.Briggs & L.A.S.Johnson
- Willdenowia Thunb.
- Winifredia L.A.S.Johnson & B.G.Briggs
