= Lawrence Alexander Sidney Johnson =

Australian botanist (1925–1997)

Lawrence Alexander Sidney Johnson AM FAA
- Born: 26 June 1925; Australia
- Died: 1 August 1997 (aged 72); Australia
- Other name: Lawrie Johnson
- Occupation: Taxonomic botanist

Lawrence Alexander Sidney Johnson AM FAA (26 June 1925 – 1 August 1997) known as Lawrie Johnson, was an Australian taxonomic botanist. He worked at the Royal Botanic Gardens, Sydney, for the whole of his professional career, as a botanist (1948–1972), Director (1972–1985) and Honorary Research Associate (1986–1997). The standard author abbreviation L.A.S.Johnson is used to indicate this person as the author when citing a botanical name.

Alone or in collaboration with colleagues, he distinguished and described four new families of vascular plants, 33 new genera, 286 new species (including posthumous publications), and reclassified another 395 species.

Of the families he described, Rhynchocalycaceae (with B. G. Briggs, 1985) is accepted by the Angiosperm Phylogeny Group (APG). Hopkinsiaceae and Lyginiaceae, (which he and B. G. Briggs proposed in 2000 be carved out of Anarthriaceae), have not been accepted by the APG.

Johnson died of cancer in 1997.

He received many honours and awards, including:

- 1979 The Clarke Medal of the Royal Society of New South Wales
- 1984 The Mueller Medal of ANZAAS
- 1986 Elected a Fellow of the Australian Academy of Science
- 1987 Appointed a Member of the Order of Australia (AM) "For service to the science of botany as Director of the Royal Botanic Gardens in Sydney"

== Works ==
- A classification of the eucalypts with L. D. Pryor, 1971, ISBN 0-7081-0563-7
- The names of acacias of New South Wales with a guide to pronunciation of botanical names with Norman Hall, 1993, ISBN 0-7310-0118-4
- The Royal Botanic Gardens, Sydney with A.N. Rodd, 1978, ISBN 0-7240-1609-0

Awards
Preceded by D. T. Anderson	Clarke Medal; 1979	Succeeded by W. Stephenson
