= Merlin Owen Pasco =

New Zealand entomogist

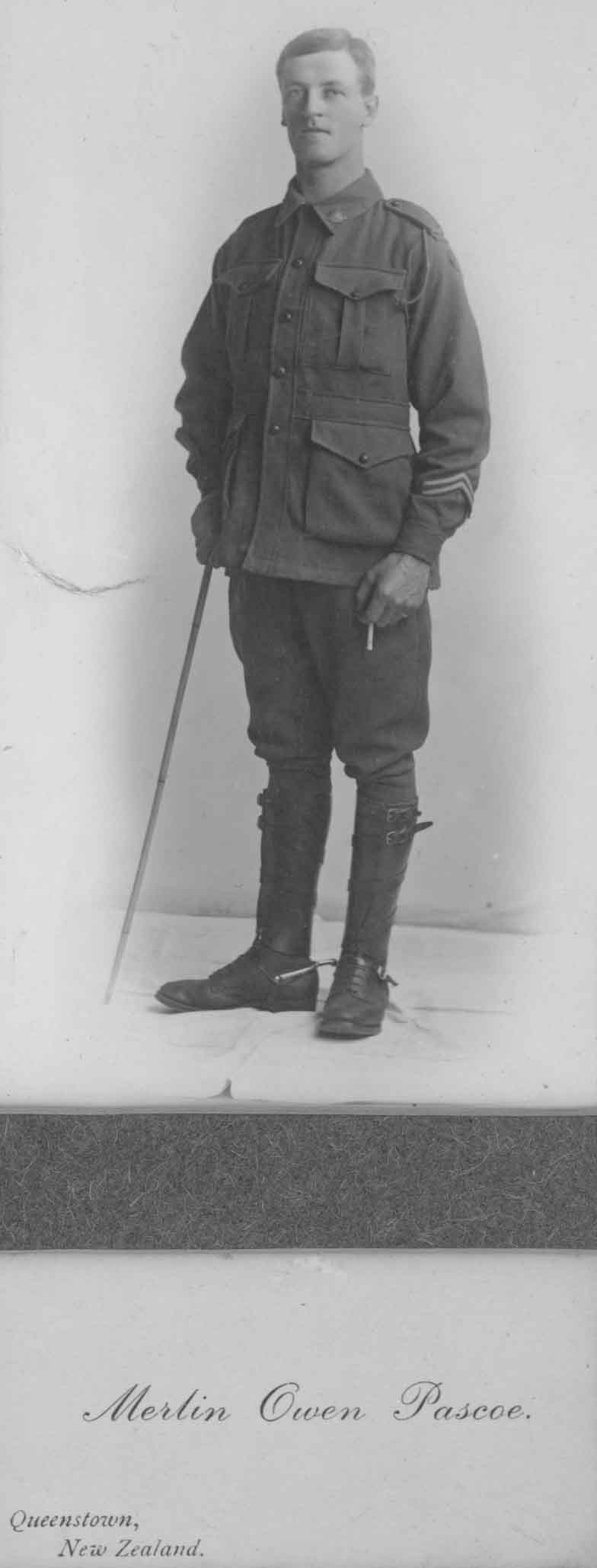
- Born: 1892; Kumara, New Zealand
- Died: 6 August 1918 (aged 25–26); Corbie, France
- Cause of death: Killed in action
- Resting place: La Neuville British Cemetery, Corbie
- Other name: Merlin Owen Pascoe
- Citizenship: New Zealand
- Known for: Discovering new species in New Zealand.
- Scientific career
- Fields: Entomology

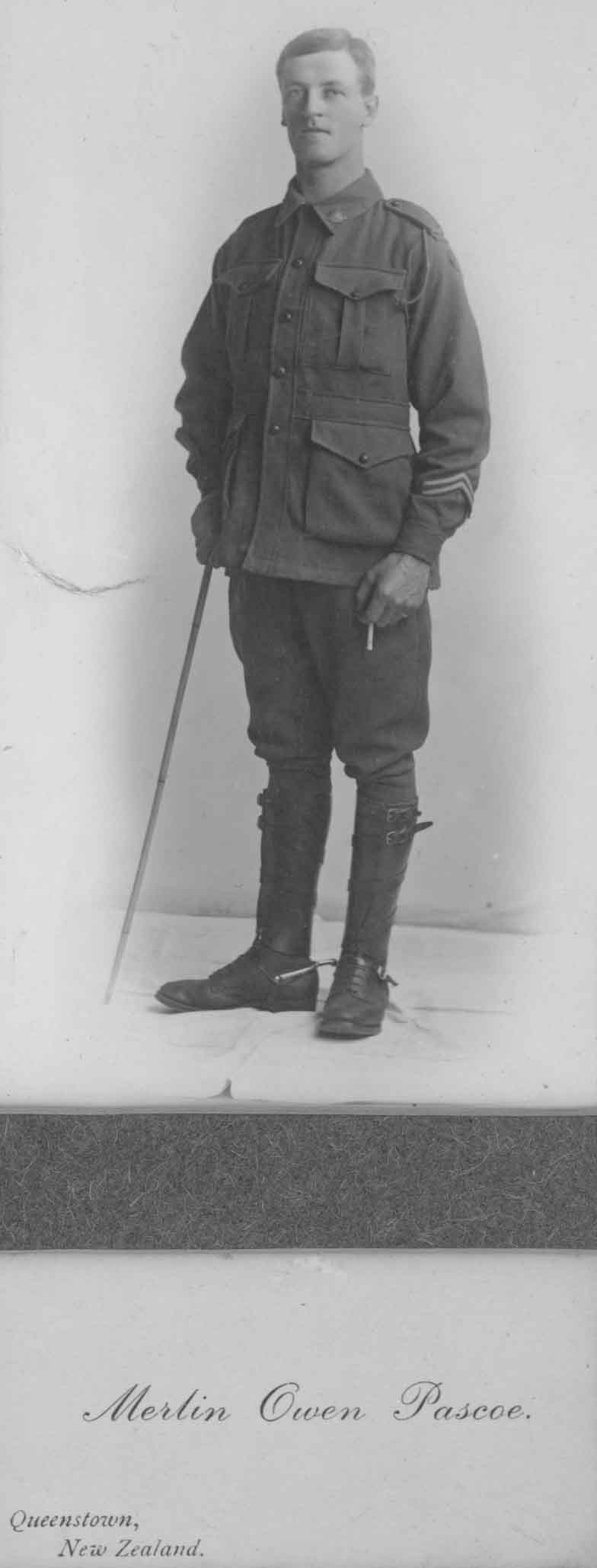

Merlin Owen Pasco (1892 – 6 August 1918) was a New Zealand entomologist. Pasco discovered several species of moth previously unknown to science and collected numerous specimens.

== Early life and collecting ==
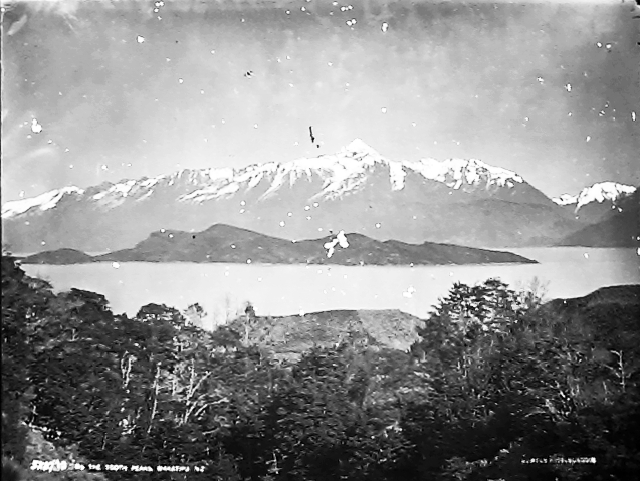
The Tooth Peaks, Wakatipu, New Zealand

Pasco was born in Kumara and moved to Queenstown as a child. An amateur entomologist, Pasco created a significant collection of New Zealand lepidoptera in the early 1900s. His collection was particularly notable as it contained specimens collected in and around Queenstown and included type specimens of numerous moth species. Pasco was one of the most productive collectors of type specimens of beetle species described by Thomas Broun. Broun acknowledged the research assistance Pasco gave him and named the beetle species Pterostichus pascoi in Pasco's honour. However this species name was subsequently synonymised by Everard Baldwin Britton and this beetle is now known as Megadromus sandageri. Pasco was the first entomologist to collect on Tooth Peaks, Wakatipu in Otago.

== Species discovered by Pasco ==
- Aponotoreas dissimilis (Philpott, 1914)
- Tatosoma fasciata Philpott 1914
- Chloroclystis magnimaculata Philpott 1915
- Declana sinuosa Philpott 1915
- Orocrambus cultus Philpott 1917

== WW1 service and death ==
At the commencement of World War One, Pasco volunteered to serve in the New Zealand Armed Forces but was turned down. He then travelled to Australia and joined the Australian 2nd Division. He served with the Division in Egypt, Gallipoli, and then in France. Pasco was killed in action near the village of Corbie in France on 6 August 1918. He was 25 years old when he died. Pasco is buried at the La Neuville British Cemetery, Corbie.

== Eponyms ==
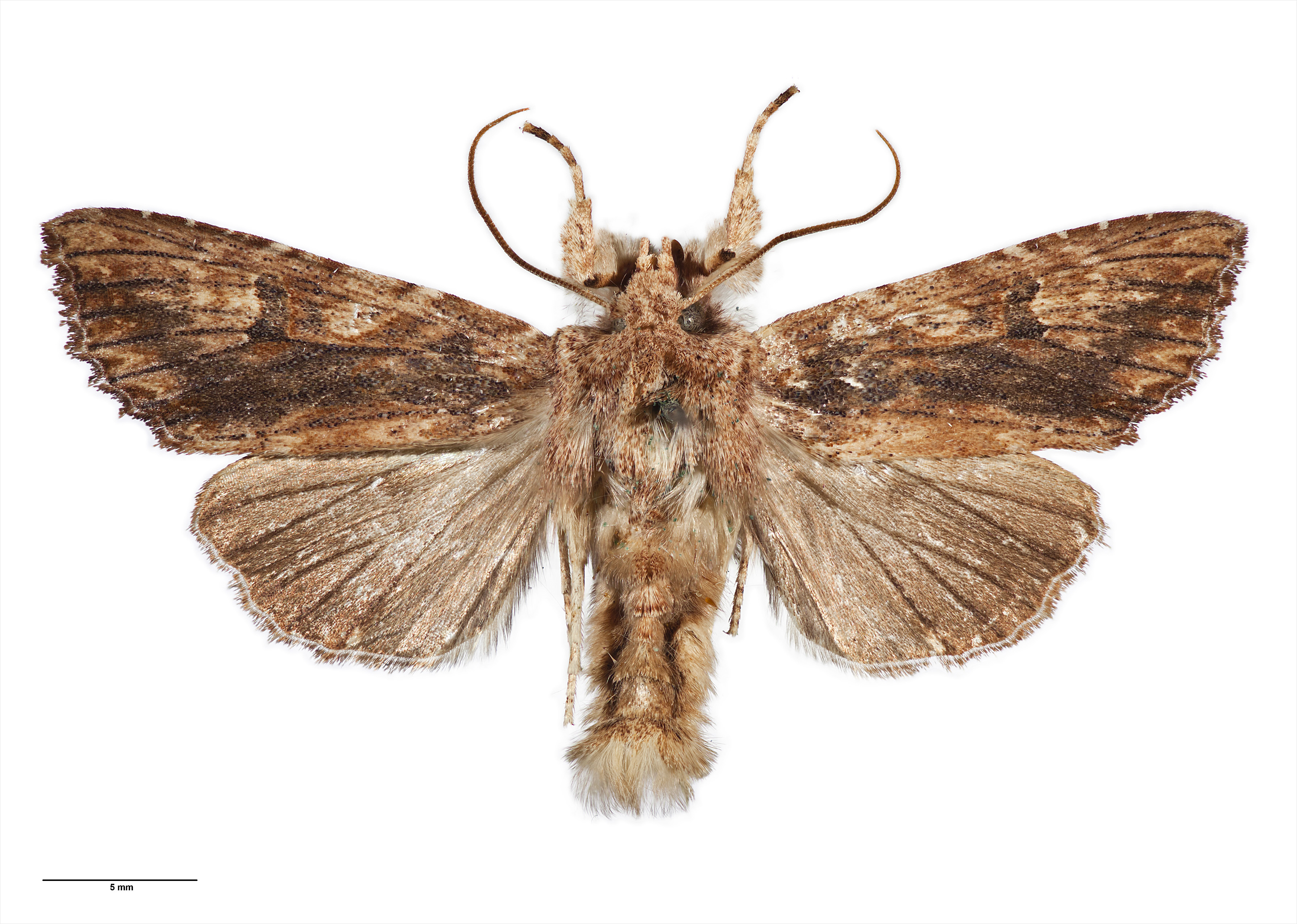
Meterana pascoei

Several species were named in honour of Pasco in recognition of his collecting efforts. These species include Scoparia pascoella and Meterana pascoei.
