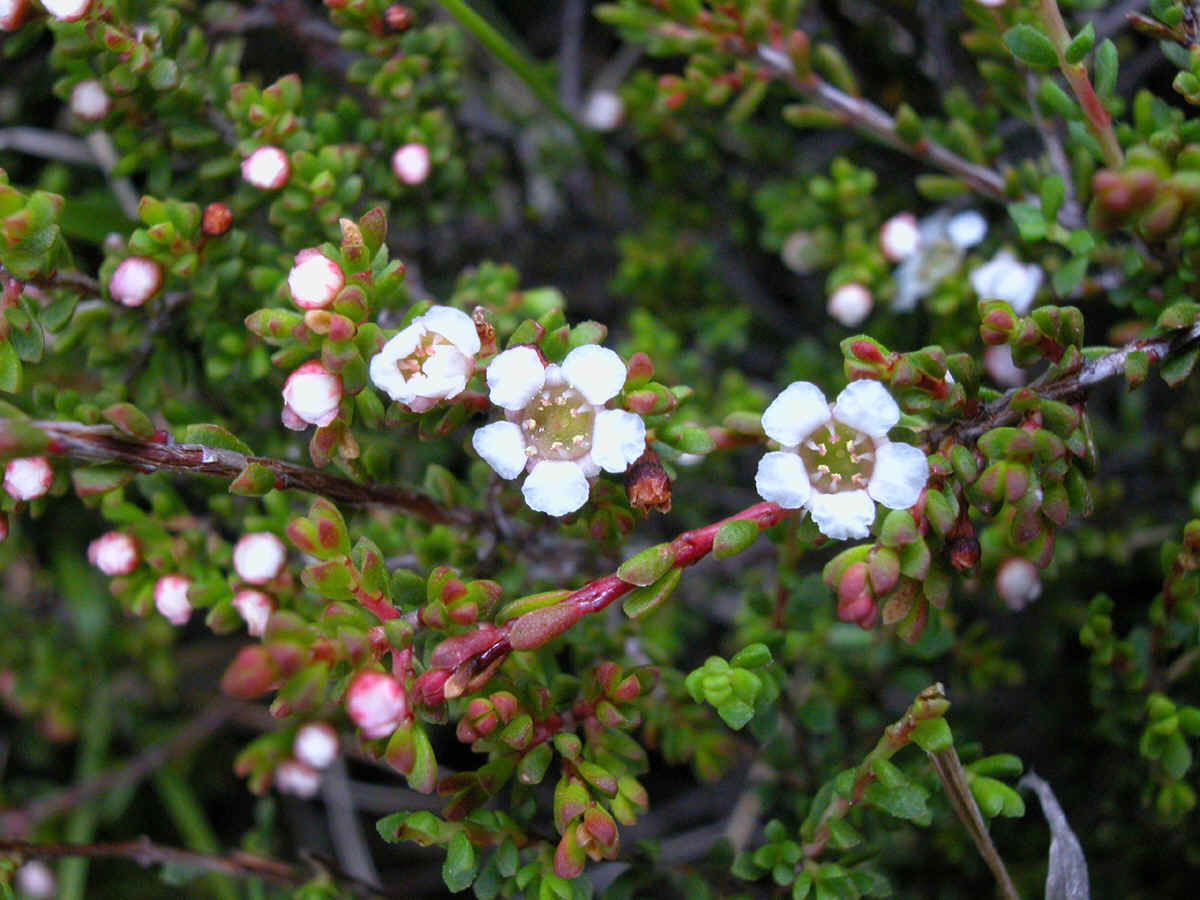
- Baeckea gunniana

Conservation status
- Least Concern (IUCN 3.1)

Scientific classification
- Kingdom: Plantae
- Clade: Tracheophytes
- Clade: Angiosperms
- Clade: Eudicots
- Clade: Rosids
- Order: Myrtales
- Family: Myrtaceae
- Genus: Baeckea
- Species: B. gunniana

Binomial name
- Baeckea gunniana Schauer
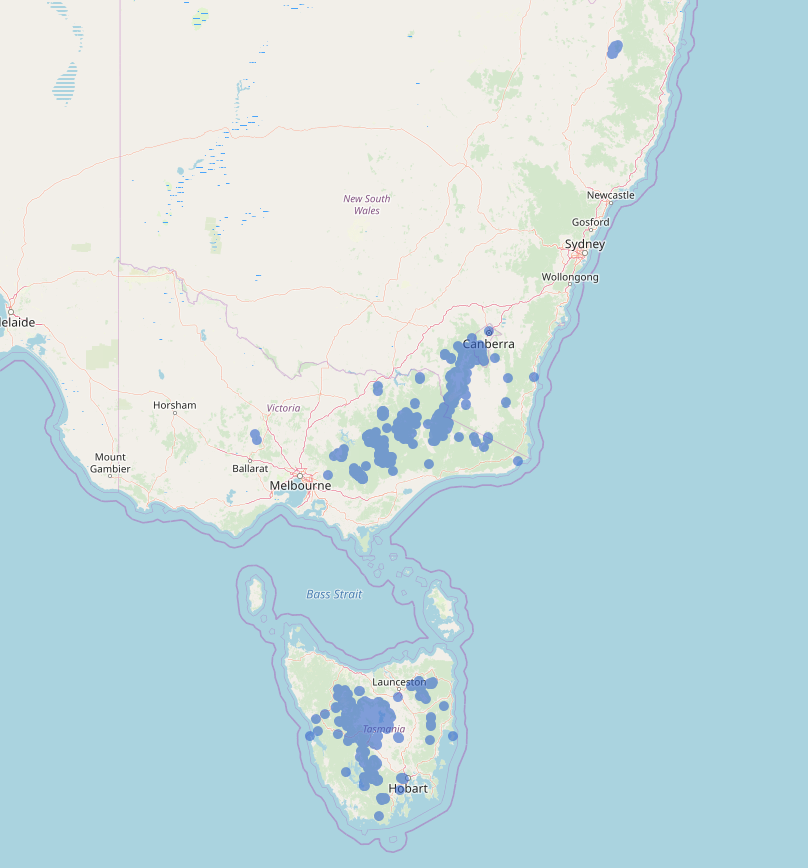
- Distribution map from the Atlas of Living Australia

Synonyms
- Baeckea gunniana Schauer var. gunniana; Baeckea micrantha Hook.f. nom. illeg.; Tetrapora gunniana (Schauer) Miq.; Tetraspora gunniana Miq. orth. var.

= Baeckea gunniana =

Alpine baeckea

Species of flowering plant

Baeckea gunniana, commonly known as alpine baeckea, is a species of flowering plant in the family Myrtaceae and is endemic to alpine and sub-alpine areas of south-eastern Australia. It is a densely-branched shrub with egg-shaped to oblong leaves and small white flowers with four to six stamens.

== Description ==
Baeckea gunniana is a smooth, compact shrub growing up to 1.5 m (4 ft 11 in) high, although it can reach up to 2 m (6 ft 7 in) at lower altitudes. It is sometimes prostrate, spreading over rocks and boulders. The branchlets have papery or fibrous brown bark. The leaves are crowded, elliptical to egg-shaped with the narrower end towards the base, 1.9–3.8 mm (0.075–0.150 in) long, 0.9–1.4 mm (0.035–0.055 in) wide on a petiole about 0.5 mm (0.020 in) long and have smooth edges. The flowers up to 5 mm (0.20 in) in diameter and are borne singly in upper leaf axils, each flower on a pedicel 0.4–1 mm (0.016–0.039 in) long. The sepals are triangular to oblong, 0.6–0.8 mm (0.024–0.031 in) long and the petals are white, more or less round and 1.5–1.8 mm (0.059–0.071 in) long. There are four to six stamens all about the same length. The ovary has a single locule, the style is needle-shaped and in a small dent in the top of the ovary. (The unilocular ovary is unique in the genus.) The fruit is a cup-like capsule, the seeds small and angular, remaining inconspicuous on the ground upon release.

== Taxonomy and phylogeny ==
Baeckea gunniana was first formally described in 1843 by the German botanist Johannes Conrad Schauer in Walpers' book Repertorium Botanices Systematicae. The specific epithet (gunniana) honours Ronald Campbell Gunn.

== Distribution and habitat ==
Alpine baeckea is restricted to alpine or subalpine regions, from Mount Ginini in the Australian Capital Territory and Mount Kosciuszko in south-eastern New South Wales to eastern Victoria and south-western Tasmania. Baeckea gunniana is most prevalent at high altitudes between 1,000 to 1,400 m (3,300 to 4,600 ft) , however, it has been observed to grow above 2,000 m (6,600 ft) near Mount Kosciuszko, and as low as 450 m (1,480 ft) in western Tasmania.

Baeckea gunniana is commonly found growing with species such as Callistemon pityoides, Epacris paludosa, and Empodisma minus, in heathlands or boggy sedgeland. It is also common near creeks, and sometimes in shaded areas under Eucalyptus species.

== Ecology ==
This species forms an integral part of the broad-toothed mouse habitat in New South Wales, providing protection from predators and large grazers.

== Uses ==
=== Use in horticulture ===
The seed coat/covering or testa of some Baeckea species has been recorded to form a physical barrier inhibiting seed germination. This may be reverted by removing or nicking the testa using a needle or scalpel, improving the rate of germination. B. gunniana can also be vegetatively propagated from cuttings of semi-hardened new growth.

=== Other uses ===
Baeckea leaves are edible and often used as a tea substitute because of their aromatic citrus-like flavour. Extracts from B. gunniana have been found to inhibit the activity of DNA Polymerase enzyme.
