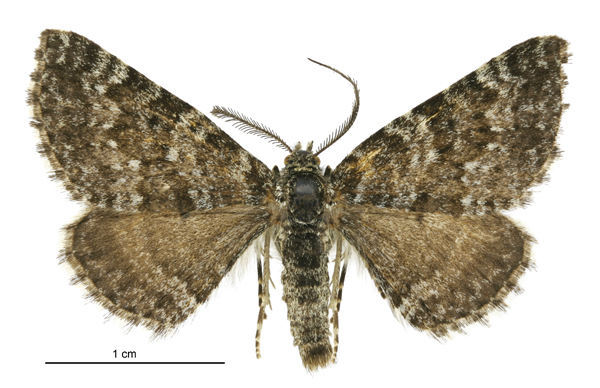
- Male specimen
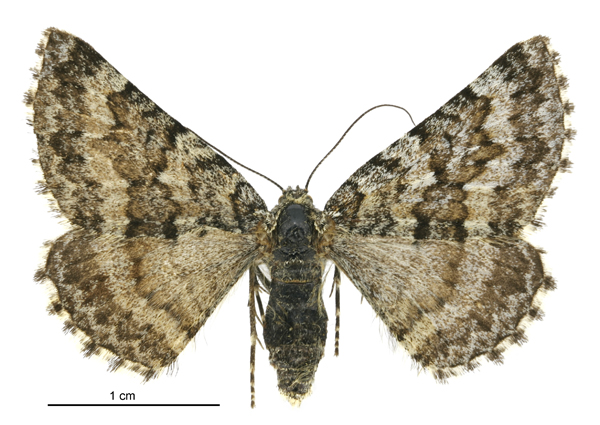
- Female specimen

Scientific classification
- Kingdom: Animalia
- Phylum: Arthropoda
- Class: Insecta
- Order: Lepidoptera
- Family: Geometridae
- Subfamily: Larentiinae
- Tribe: Hydriomenini
- Genus: Aponotoreas
- Species: A. incompta

Binomial name
- Aponotoreas incompta (Philpott, 1918)

Synonyms
- Notoreas incompta Philpott, 1918

= Aponotoreas incompta =

Species of moth

Aponotoreas incompta is a moth of the family Geometridae. It is endemic to New Zealand.

== Taxonomy ==
This species was first described by Alfred Philpott in 1918 under the name Notoreas incompta. In 1986 R. C. Craw described the new genus Aponotoreas and included A. incompta within it.

== Description ==
Philpott stated that A. incompta was hardly indistinguishable in colour from A. orphnaea but that A. incompta differs as its antennal pectinations are shorter and it has less developed palpal hairs.

== Distribution ==
The type specimen of this species was collected in January by R. Gibb, at the time the curator of the Southland Museum, in the Kepler Mountains at a height of approximately 900 metres. Specimens have also been collected around Arthur's Pass and the Hunter Mountains. A. incompta is regarded as an upland species of Fiordland but is also present as an outlier in the Old Man Range / Kopuwai region of Central Otago.

== Host plant ==
Hudson noted that when he collected specimens at Arthurs Pass, A. incompta frequented Helichrysum although he did not state the host species of this moth. Larvae of this moth have been found on Dracophyllum species.
