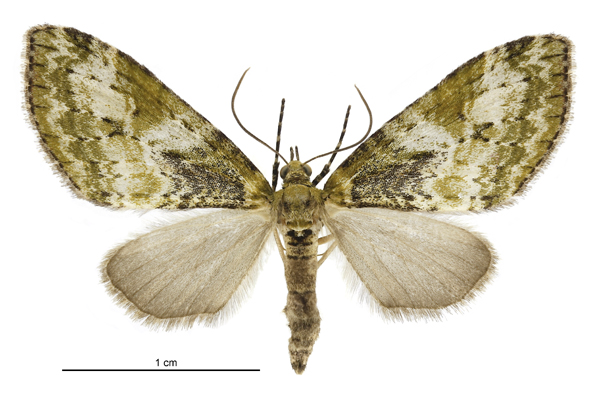
- Female
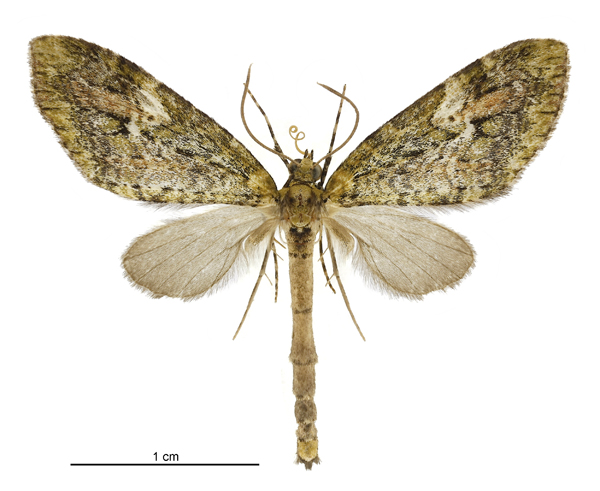
- Male

Scientific classification
- Kingdom: Animalia
- Phylum: Arthropoda
- Clade: Pancrustacea
- Class: Insecta
- Order: Lepidoptera
- Family: Geometridae
- Genus: Tatosoma
- Species: T. topea

Binomial name
- Tatosoma topea Philpott, 1903

Synonyms
- Tatosoma topia Philpott, 1903

= Tatosoma topea =

Species of moth endemic to New Zealand

Tatosoma topea is a species of moth in the family Geometridae. This species was first described by Alfred Philpott in 1903. It is endemic to New Zealand.

== Hosts ==
The larvae of this species have been reared on mataī foliage.
