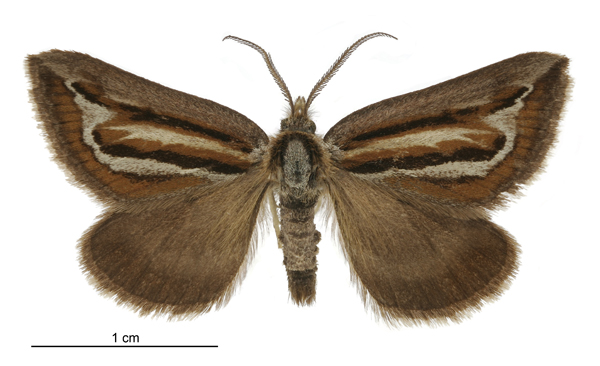
- Male specimen
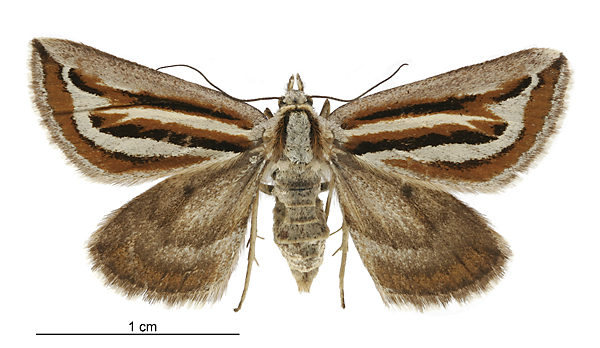
- Female specimen

Scientific classification
- Kingdom: Animalia
- Phylum: Arthropoda
- Class: Insecta
- Order: Lepidoptera
- Family: Geometridae
- Subfamily: Larentiinae
- Tribe: Hydriomenini
- Genus: Aponotoreas
- Species: A. synclinalis

Binomial name
- Aponotoreas synclinalis (Hudson, 1903)

Synonyms
- Notoreas synclinalis Hudson, 1903

= Aponotoreas synclinalis =

Species of moth

Aponotoreas synclinalis (also known as the Wirerush looper) is a moth of the family Geometridae. It is endemic to New Zealand.

== Taxonomy ==
This species was first described by George Vernon Hudson in 1903 as Notoreas synclinalis from a type specimen discovered by Alfred Philpott at Seaward Moss near Invercargill on 4 January 1900. In 1986 R. C. Craw described the new genus Aponotoreas and included A. synclinalis within it.

== Distribution ==
This moth is common in upland areas of the Catlins, Longwood Range and Stewart Island. It is also present in south-west Fiordland. It is unusual as it is only one of two species in its genus where specimens have been collected at sea level.

== Behaviour ==
This species is day flying and is on the wing from January until March.

== Host plants ==
The host plant of the larvae of A. synclinalis is Empodisma minus, the lesser wire rush, and in alpine areas of Stewart Island is Dracophyllum politum.
