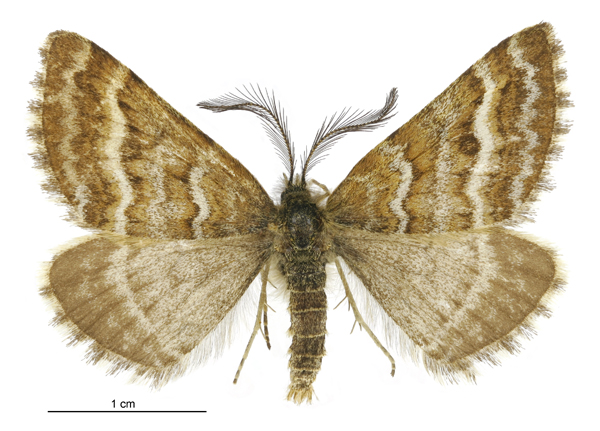
- Male specimen
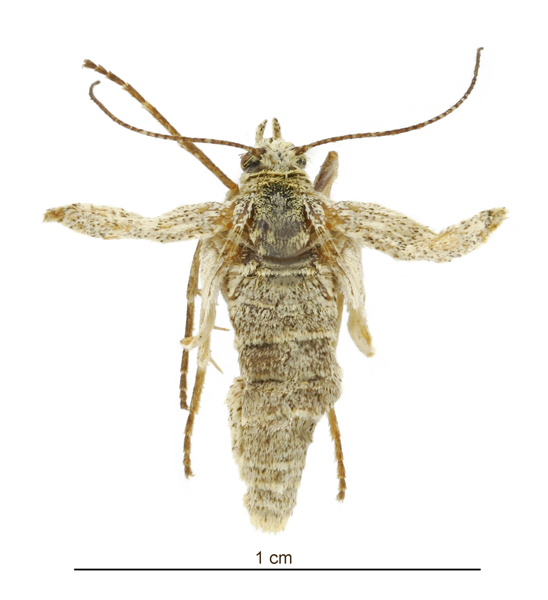
- Female specimen

Scientific classification
- Kingdom: Animalia
- Phylum: Arthropoda
- Class: Insecta
- Order: Lepidoptera
- Family: Geometridae
- Subfamily: Larentiinae
- Tribe: Hydriomenini
- Genus: Aponotoreas
- Species: A. villosa

Binomial name
- Aponotoreas villosa (Philpott, 1917)

Synonyms
- Notoreas villosa Philpott, 1917

= Aponotoreas villosa =

Species of moth

Aponotoreas villosa is a moth of the family Geometridae. It is endemic to New Zealand.

== Taxonomy ==
This species was first described by Alfred Philpott as Notoreas villosa in 1917. In 1986 R. C. Craw described the new genus Aponotoreas and included A. villosa within it.

== Distribution ==
The male of this species was first collected in 1910 at The Hump, near Waiau and the female of the species was discovered in 1915 by C. C. Fenwick in the same locality. A. villosa has also been found in the Hunter Mountains.

== Habitat ==
A. villosa inhabits grassland areas up to 1200 metres in altitude.

== Life cycle ==
Adult moths are normally seen between December and February.
