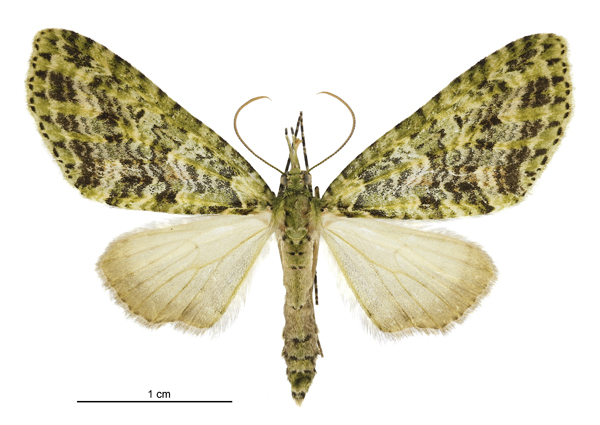
- Female
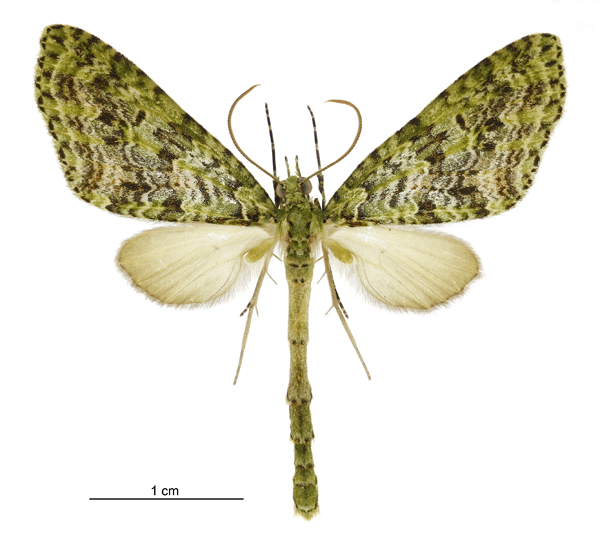
- Male

Scientific classification
- Kingdom: Animalia
- Phylum: Arthropoda
- Clade: Pancrustacea
- Class: Insecta
- Order: Lepidoptera
- Family: Geometridae
- Genus: Tatosoma
- Species: T. tipulata

Binomial name
- Tatosoma tipulata (Walker, 1862)

Synonyms
- Cidaria tipulata Walker, 1862; Cidaria inclinataria Walker, 1862; Sauris mistata Felder & Rogenhofer, 1875

= Tatosoma tipulata =

Species of moth endemic to New Zealand

Tatosoma tipulata, also known as the kāmahi green spindle, is a species of moth in the family Geometridae. It was first described by Francis Walker in 1862. It is endemic to New Zealand and occurs in the North, South and Stewart Islands. This species inhabits native bush. The larvae have been recorded as feeding on Pterophylla racemosa, Nothofagus cliffortioides and Podocarpus totara. Adult moths are most commonly observed on the wing from September until March. Adults are nocturnal and are slightly attracted to light. They have also been collected via sugar traps. During the day adults can often be observed resting, camouflaged against moss and lichens, on the trunks of trees.

== Taxonomy ==
This species was first described by Francis Walker in 1862 and named Cidaria tipulata using a specimen collected either at Hawke's Bay or Taupō by William Colenso. Walker, thinking he was describing a new species, also named this moth Cidaria inclinataria. In 1874 Arthur Gardiner Butler placed this species, then known as Cidaria agrionata var. tipulata, in the genus Tatosoma. This species was again described by Cajetan von Felder and Alois Friedrich Rogenhofer in 1875 and named Sauris mistata. In 1927 Louis Beethoven Prout synonymised Sauris mistata with T. tipulata. George Hudson discussed and illustrated this species under the name T. tipulata in his 1928 book The butterflies and moths of New Zealand. In 1939 Hudson again discussed and illustrated this species, giving descriptions of the egg, larvae and pupa as well as more details about the life cycle of this species. In 1988 J. S. Dugdale synonymised C. inclinataria with T. tipulata. The male lectotype is held at the Natural History Museum, London.

== Description ==
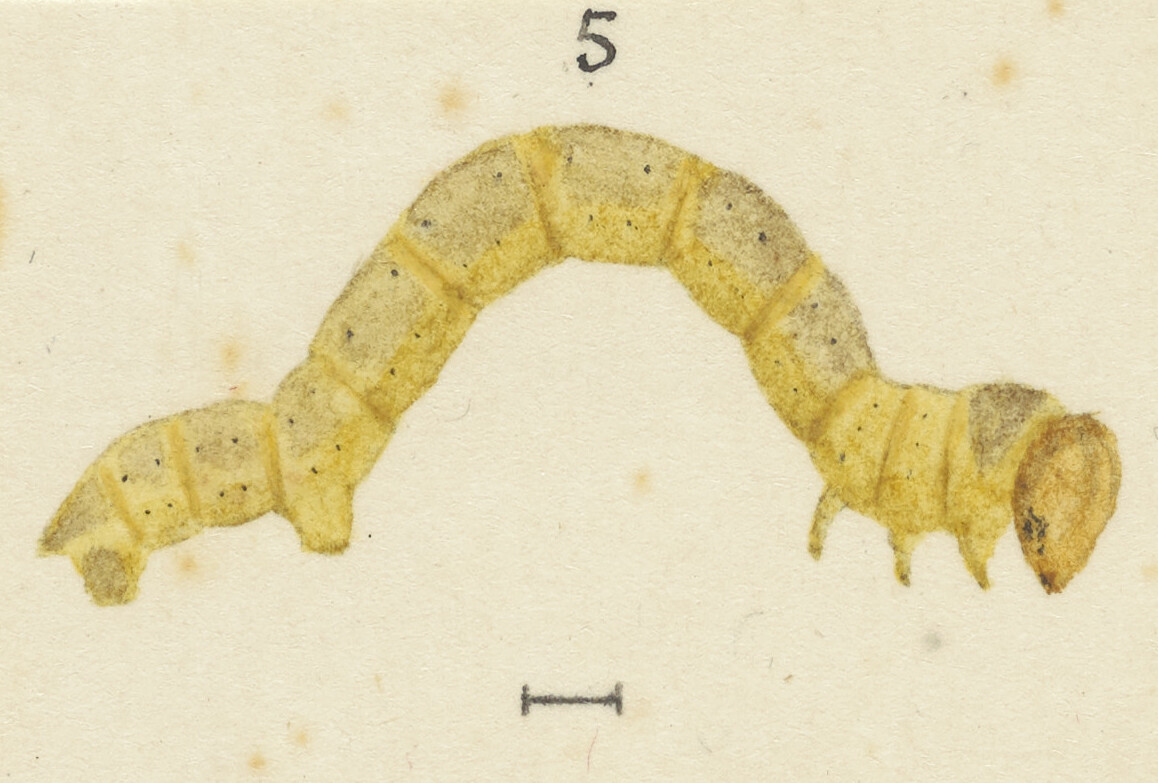
Newly hatched larva.

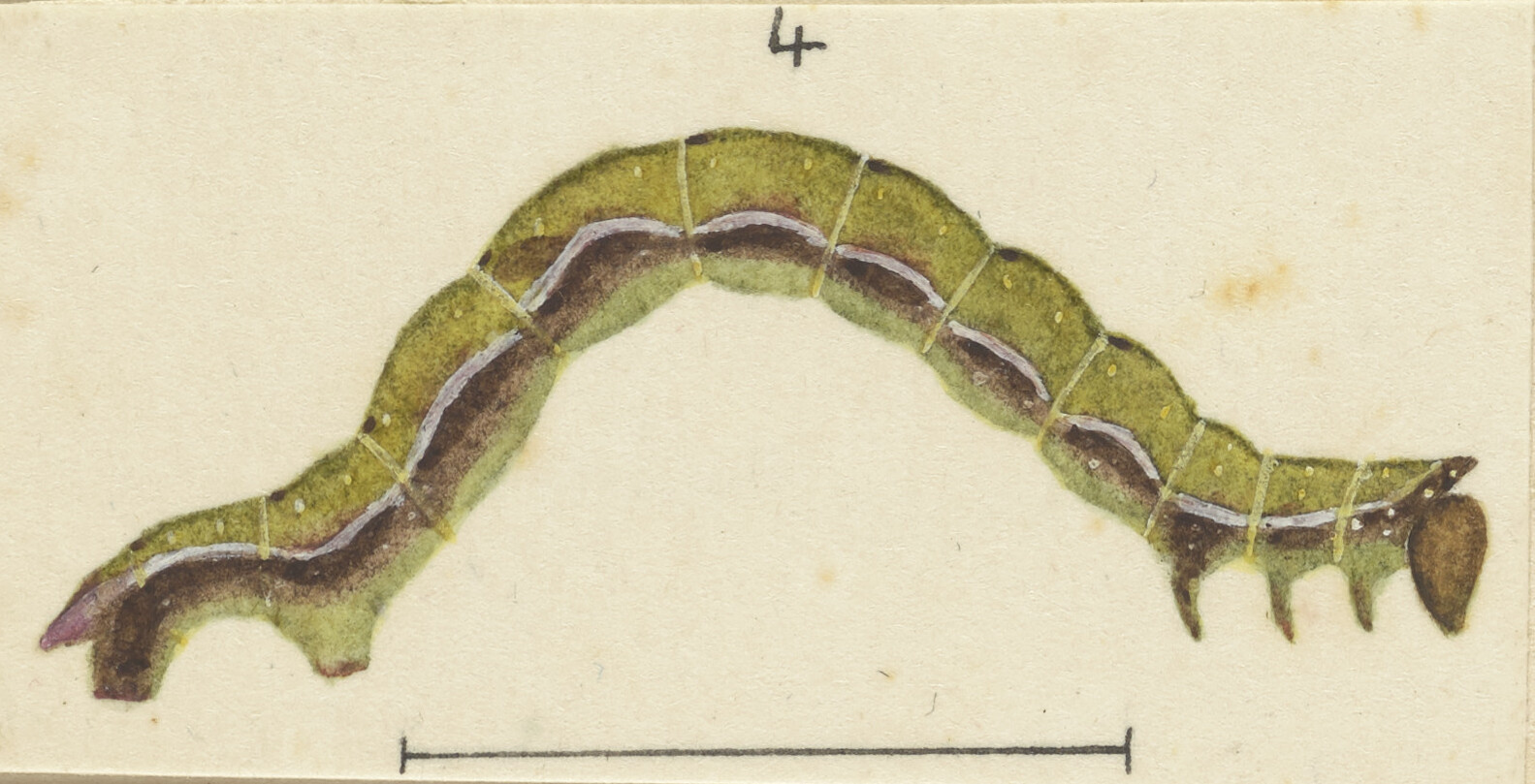
Fully grown larva.

Hudson described the egg of this species as follows:

The egg is about 1-40th inch in length, oval, considerably flattened on each side and covered with very shallow hexagonal depressions; colour deep ochreous-yellow. It is laid on its side. About two days after being deposited the side becomes strongly concave and the colour changes to reddish-orange. Eggs were obtained early in December.

Hudson described the newly emerged larvae of this species as follows:

The length of the newly-emerged larva is under 1-10th inch; it is stout, cylindrical, with the head and segment 2 very large, thence tapering to segment 5, and afterwards becoming slightly stouter; the anal flap is bifid, and the anal prolegs largely extended laterally; general colour bright yellow, slightly brownish on back, especially posteriorly; segmental divisions very distinct, deep yellow; a few very minute black warts.

Hudson pointed out that when mature, the colouration of the larvae of this species is variable. He reared a variety of T. tipulata larvae to adulthood and confirmed their species upon the completion of each specimen's metamorphosis. The pupa is just under 1 inch in length and is thin in appearance. It is a green brown colour but is a lighter shade on the wing-cases.

Walker described the adults of this species as follows:

Male and female. Olive-green. Palpi as long as the breadth of the head; third joint minute. Antennae stout, smooth. Abdomen cylindrical, slender, very long, especially in the male, extending in that sex for half its length beyond the hind wings, and nhaving a few black points on each side. Fore wings long, narrow, slightly rounded at the tips, with several undulating irregular brown or blackish lines; middle space with two irregular approximate brownish bands; discal streak brown; fringe with pairs of black points; exterior border extremely oblique. Hind wings cinereous; interior border excavated and with an inflated lappet towards the base. Length of the body 9 lines; of the wings 18 lines.

Hudson also described the adults of this species as follows:

The expansion of the wings is about 1 1/2 inches. The fore-wings are bright-green traversed by numerous black, wavy, transverse lines; these black lines are grouped into four more or less distinct bands, the outermost of which is interrupted at each of the veins; there is a conspicuous black dot in the middle of the wing, a number of small triangular, subterminal black marks and a series of minute terminal black dots. The hind-wings are ochreous, tinged with green towards the termen. In the female the abdomen is much shorter, and the hind-wings are larger than in the male. The palpi are fully twice as long as in the female of T. agrionata.

T. tipulata is very similar in appearance to T. agrionata and can be confused with that species. T. tipulata can be distinguished as it has a Z-shaped basal line and lacks the conspicuous large pale patch near tornus of T. agrionata. Robert Hoare has also stated that T. agrionata has is a very distinct black V on the forewing dorsum near the base that appears to be a distinguishing feature as it is not present on T. tipulata.

== Distribution ==
This species is endemic to New Zealand. This species occurs in the North Island, in the South Island and also at Stewart Island.

== Habitat and hosts ==
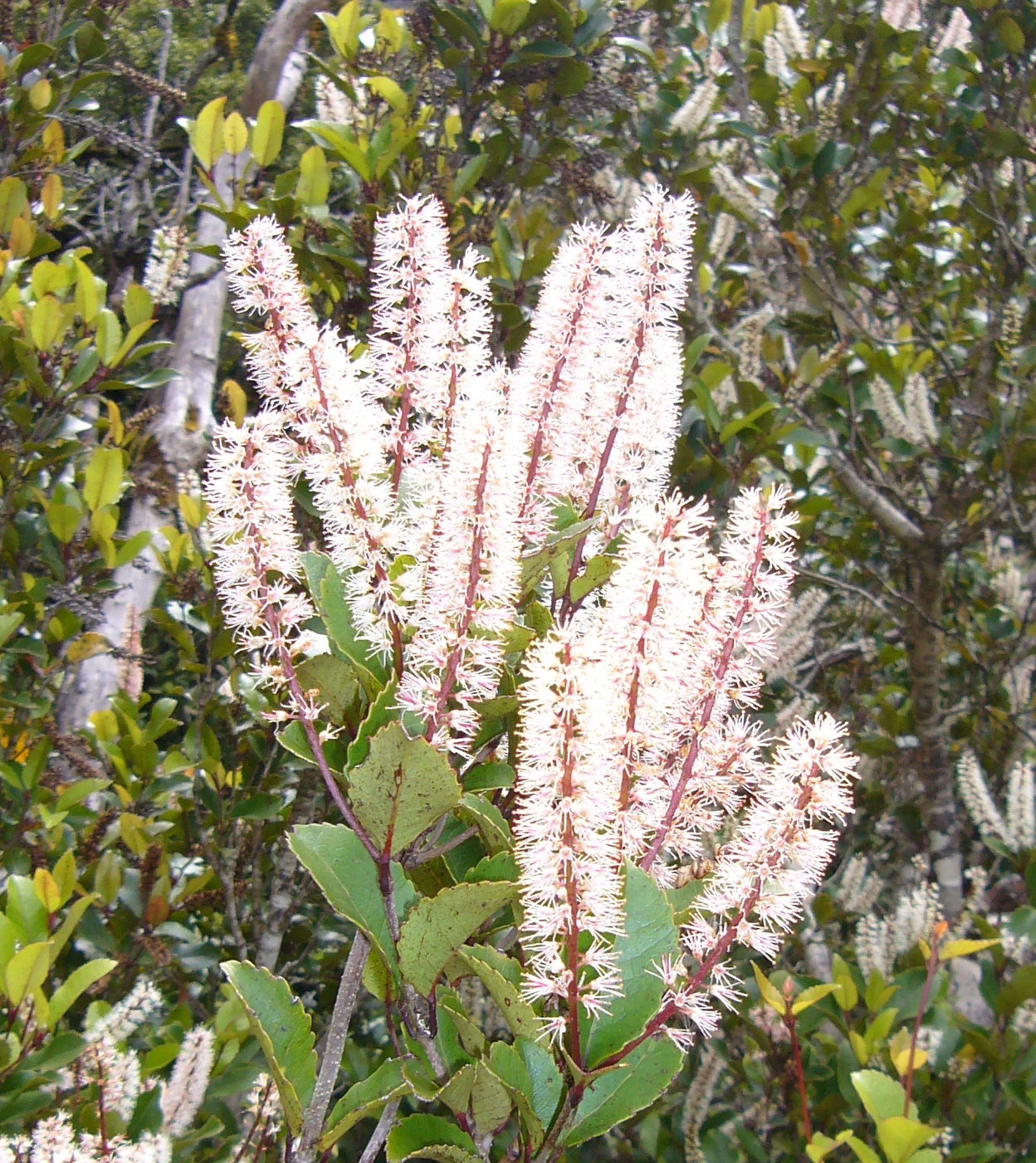
Larval host P. racemosa.

This species inhabits dense native forest. The larval hosts of this species include Pterophylla racemosa, Nothofagus cliffortioides and Podocarpus totara with the larvae feeding on the leaves of these trees.

== Life history ==
The yellow coloured eggs have been observed being laid in December and from them emerges a small yellow larva. The larva, when fully grown, is a bright green with lines of a different shade of green along its back. It has a brown ridge along its side and a pale line above that. The larvae pupates in a cocoon amongst the leaf litter on the ground under its food plant. The pupation has been observed as taking place in early February with the adults emerging at the end of that month. The pupa is a greenish brown in colour and is contained in a thin cocoon of silk. Hudson believed that this species has two broods a year.

== Behaviour ==
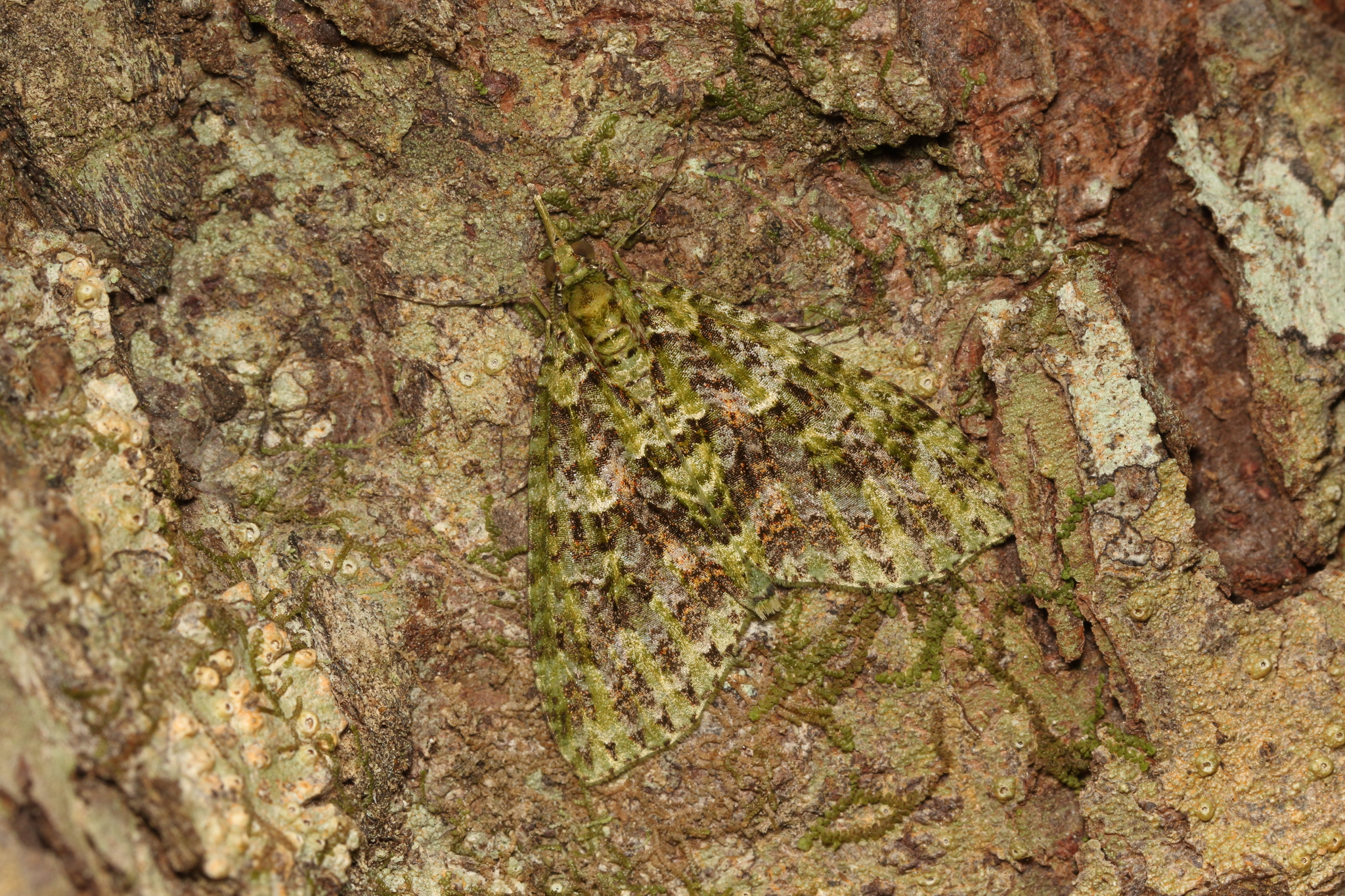
Female T. tipulata at rest.

During the day the larva is sluggish, resting looped on the edge of a leaf. This behaviour along with its colouration helps the larvae to camouflage itself against the leaves of its food plant. Adults of this species are nocturnal and are sometimes attracted to light. Adults of this species have been collected with sugar traps as well as via a mercury vapour light trap. Adults are most frequently observed on the wing from September until March. During the day the adults rest on tree trunks and are camouflaged by moss growing on the same.
