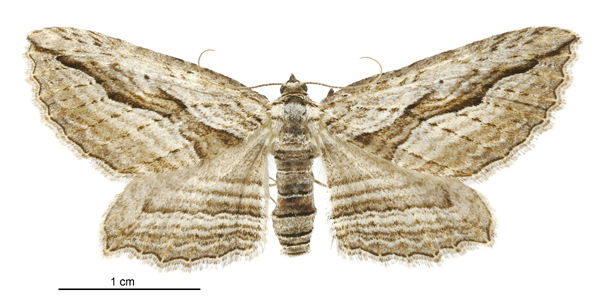
- Male specimen

Scientific classification
- Kingdom: Animalia
- Phylum: Arthropoda
- Class: Insecta
- Order: Lepidoptera
- Family: Geometridae
- Subfamily: Larentiinae
- Tribe: Hydriomenini
- Genus: Aponotoreas
- Species: A. dissimilis

Binomial name
- Aponotoreas dissimilis (Philpott, 1914)

Synonyms
- Venusia dissimilis Philpott, 1914

= Aponotoreas dissimilis =

Species of moth

Aponotoreas dissimilis is a moth of the family Geometridae. It is endemic to New Zealand.

== Taxonomy ==
This species was first described by Alfred Philpott in 1914 under the name Venusia dissimilis using material collected by Merlin Owen Pasco. In 1986 R. C. Craw described the new genus Aponotoreas and included A. dissimilis within it.

== Description ==
A. dissimilis is a reddish brown colour mixed with grey. The forewings are triangular in shape. Both the fore and hind wings have a number of dark coloured faintly waved lines on them and there is a small black disk shaped dot on the fore wings. The female of the species has a similar appearance to the male but is a more grey-brown colour.

== Distribution ==
The type specimen of this species was collected by Merlin Owen Pasco at Ben Lomond in February. Specimens have also been collected around Te Kuha.

== Host plant ==
The larvae of A. dissimilis has been shown to feed on species of Dracophyllum.
