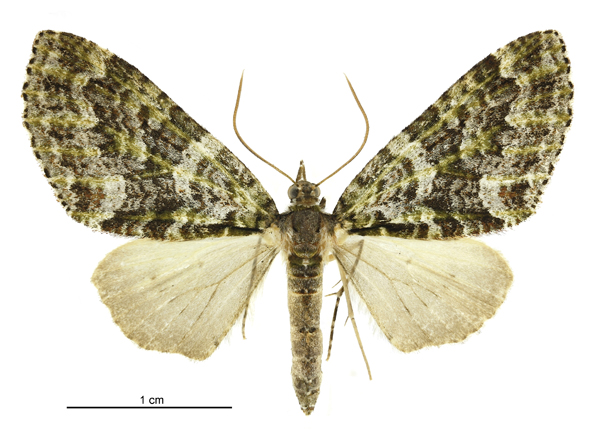
- Female
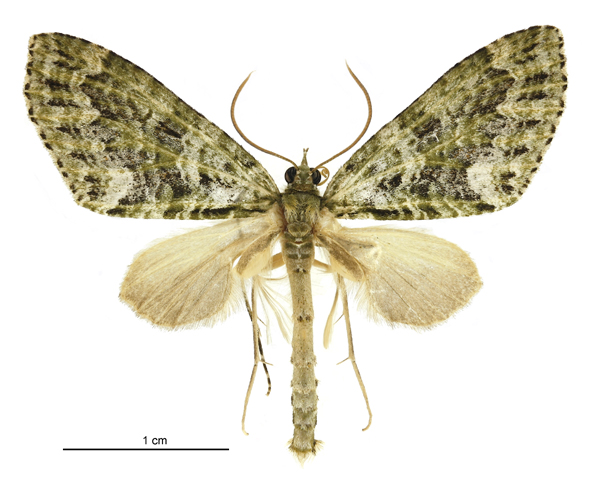
- Male

Conservation status
- Declining (NZ TCS)

Scientific classification
- Kingdom: Animalia
- Phylum: Arthropoda
- Class: Insecta
- Order: Lepidoptera
- Family: Geometridae
- Genus: Tatosoma
- Species: T. agrionata

Binomial name
- Tatosoma agrionata (Walker, 1862)

Synonyms
- Cidaria agrionata Walker, 1862; Cidaria collectaria Walker, 1862

= Tatosoma agrionata =

Species of moth

Tatosoma agrionata, also known as the mistletoe carpet moth, is a species of moth in the family Geometridae first described by Francis Walker in 1862. It is endemic to New Zealand. It is classified as at risk, declining by the Department of Conservation.

== Taxonomy ==
T. agrionata was first described by Francis Walker in 1862 using specimens collected either in Hawkes Bay or Taupō by William Colenso. Walker originally named the species Cidaria agrionata. In the same publication Walker, thinking it was a separate species, again described the moth under the name Cidaria collectaria. In 1874 Arthur Gardiner Butler placed this species in the genus Tatosoma. In 1988 John S. Dugdale synonymised this name. George Vernon Hudson discussed and illustrated this species in his 1928 book The Butterflies and Moths of New Zealand. The lectotype specimen is held in the Natural History Museum, London.

== Description ==
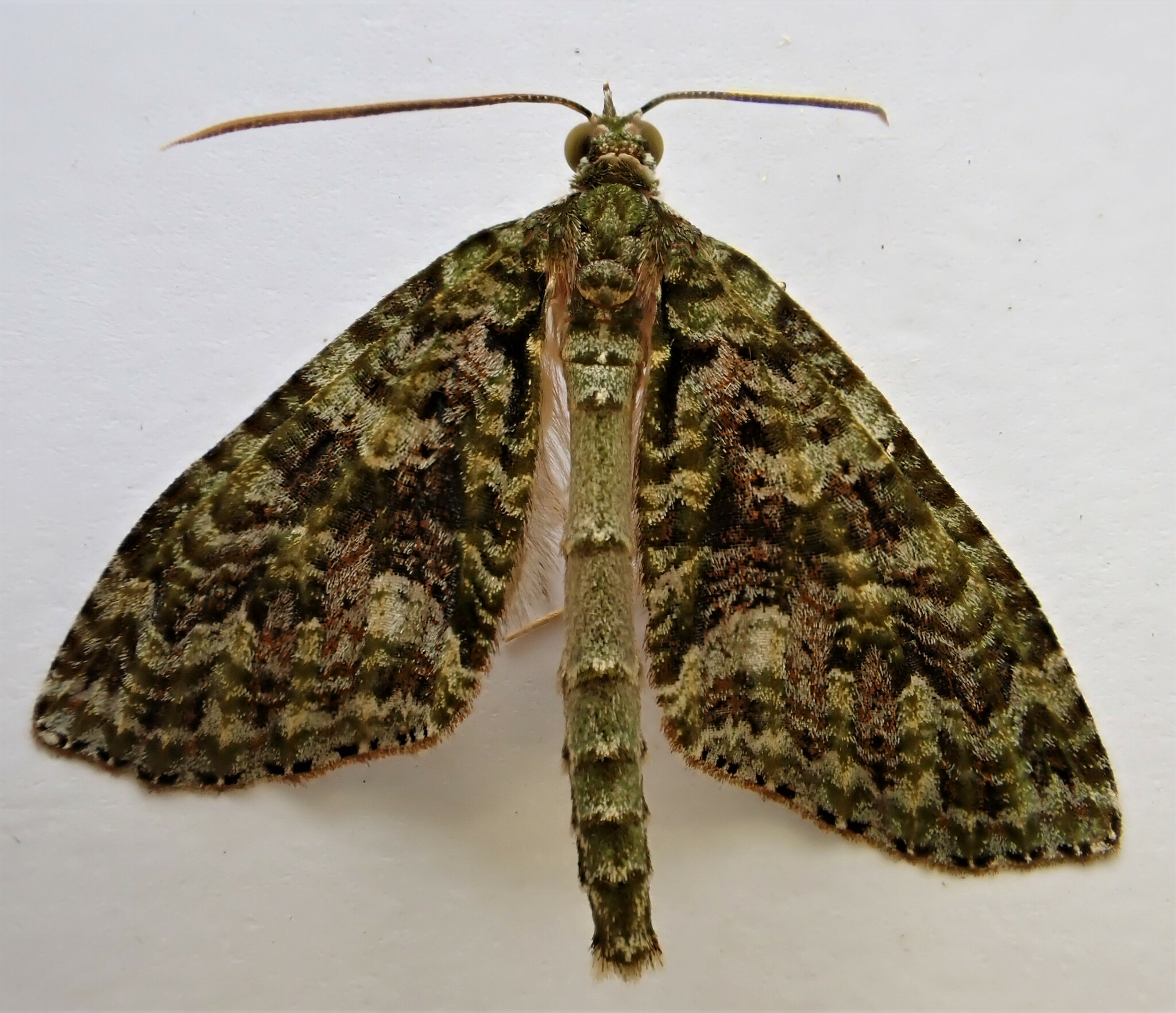
Tatosoma agrionata observed in Manaia in 2022.

The larvae of this species are orange upon hatching but as they mature they turn yellow green. They are slightly paler on their underside. When mature they form a cocoon from soil and silk on the surface of the ground underneath their host plants.

Hudson described the adults of the species as follows:

The expansion of the wings of the male is 1 1/4 inches; of the female 1 3/8 inches. On the forewings the green colouring is more or less confined to the neighbourhood of the veins and is much less pronounced than in T. tipulata; the basal and subterminal areas are transversed by several narrow cream-coloured bands, which are especially evident in the male, and the black markings are more extensive and slightly tinged with dull reddish. The abdomen of the male is considerably shorter than in the same sex of T. tipulata and the anal lope of the hind-wings nearly twice as large.

T. agrionata is very similar in appearance to Tatosoma tipulata and can be confused with that species. This species can be distinguished T. tipulata as it lacks the Z-shaped basal line and has a conspicuous large pale patch near tornus. Robert Hoare has also stated that T. agrionata has is a very distinct black V on the forewing dorsum near the base that appears to be a distinguishing feature as it is not present on T. tipulata.

== Distribution ==
This species is endemic to New Zealand. It has occurred from the Bay of Plenty to Wellington in the North Island and from Nelson to Stewart Island. In 2000 this species was regarded as possibly extinct in the North Island. However in 2022 this species was observed in the Coromandel Forest Park.

== Life cycle and behaviour ==
Larvae of T. agrionata are slow moving. Adults emerge from July to May and it has been hypothesised that there are two generations per year. The adults of this species can be looked for resting on tree trunks.

== Habitat and host plants ==
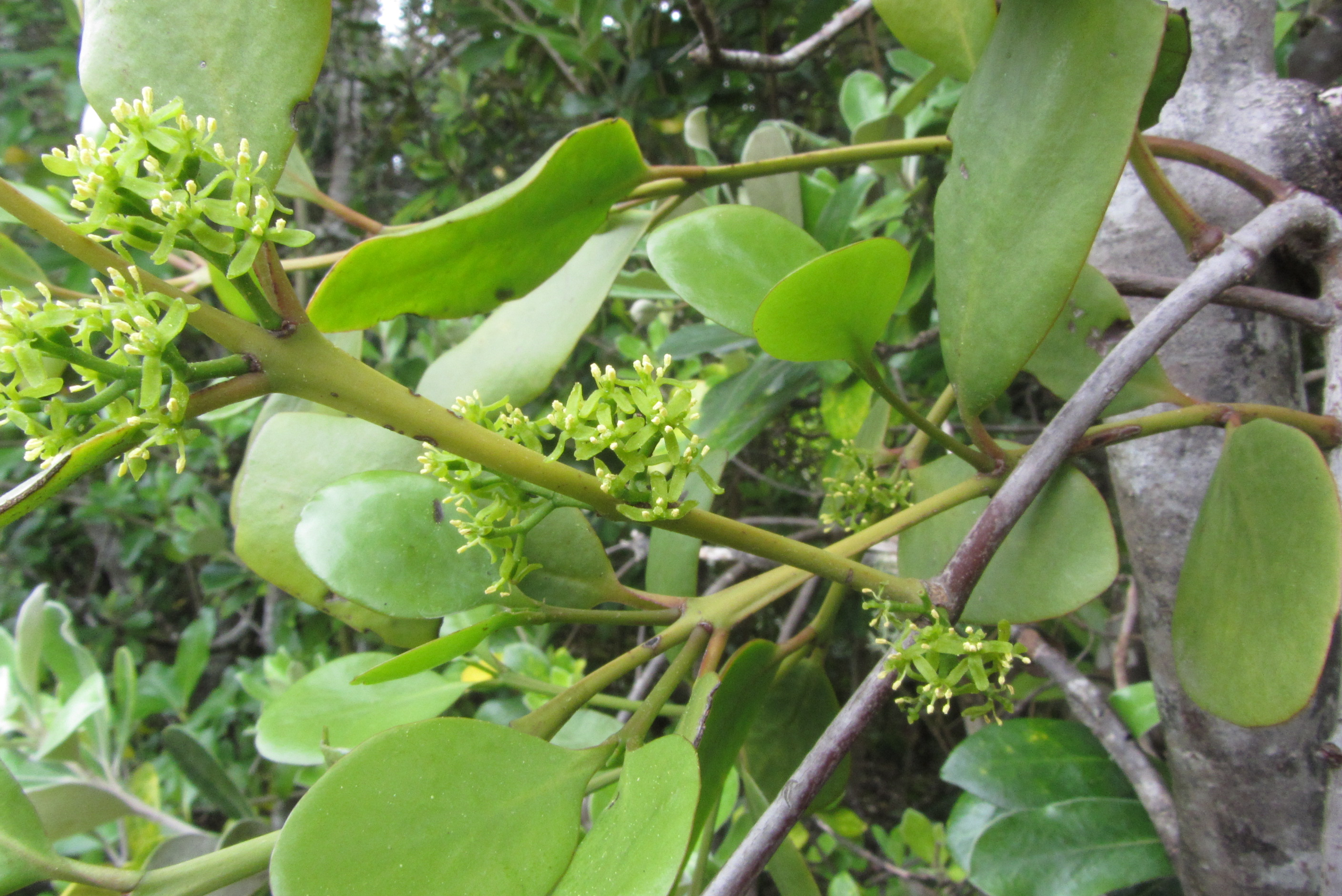
Ileostylus micranthus, a host for T. agrionata

T. agrionata frequents forest habitat and can be found up to an elevation of 900 m. The host species for the larvae of this species are native leafy Loranthaceae such as Alepis flavida, Ileostylus micranthus, Peraxilla colenso, Peraxilla tetrapetala, Trilepidea adamsii and Tupeia antarctica.

== Conservation status ==
This moth is classified under the New Zealand Threat Classification System as being at risk, declining.
