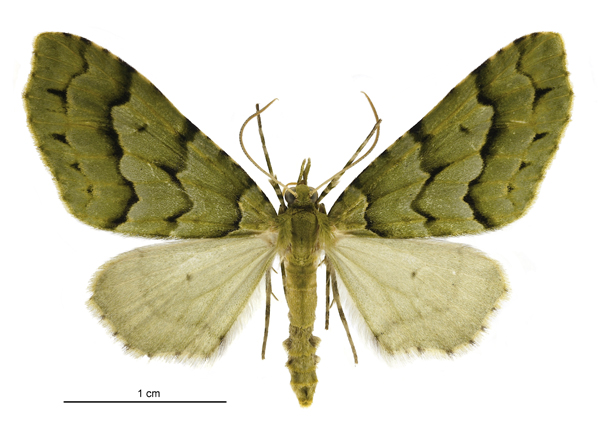
- Female
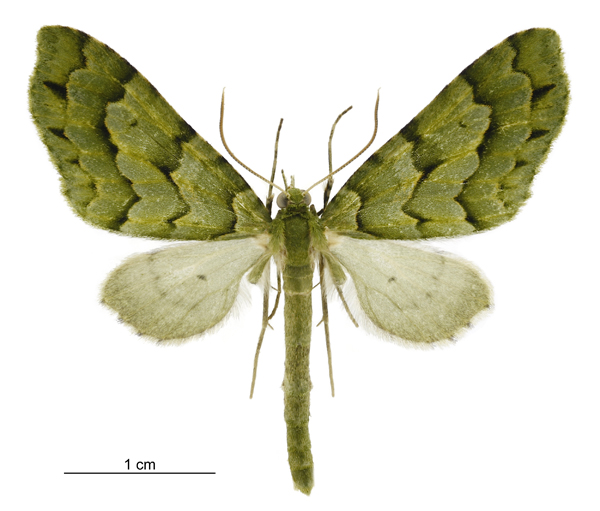
- Male

Scientific classification
- Kingdom: Animalia
- Phylum: Arthropoda
- Class: Insecta
- Order: Lepidoptera
- Family: Geometridae
- Genus: Tatosoma
- Species: T. lestevata

Binomial name
- Tatosoma lestevata (Walker, 1862)

Synonyms
- Cidaria lestevata Walker, 1862; Sauris ranata Felder & Rogenhofer, 1875

= Tatosoma lestevata =

Species of moth endemic to New Zealand

Tatosoma lestevata is a species of moth in the family Geometridae first described by Francies Walker in 1862. It is endemic to New Zealand. The common name is tutu green spindle moth.

== Taxonomy ==
T. lestevata was first described by Francis Walker in 1862 using specimens collected in Nelson by T. R. Oxley and named Cidaria lestevata. In 1874 Arthur Gardiner Butler placed this species in the genus Tatosoma. In 1875 Rudolf Felder, Cajetan von Felder and Alois Friedrich Rogenhofer, thinking they were describing a new species, named it Sauris ranata. This name was subsequently synonymised by Edward Meyrick. George Vernon Hudson discussed and illustrated this species in both his 1898 book New Zealand moths and butterflies (Macro-lepidoptera) and his 1928 book The Butterflies and Moths of New Zealand.

The male lectotype is held at the Natural History Museum, London.

== Description ==
The adult of this species was described by George Hudson as follows:

The expansion of the wings is 1 1/2 inches. The fore-wings are vivid-green; there are four wavy, black, transverse lines; the first near the base, the second a little before the middle, the third considerably beyond the middle, and the fourth near the termen; the subterminal line is very faint towards the tornus, and it emits three or four very sharp, longitudinal, black, tooth-like marks; all the transverse lines are much stronger where they cross the principal veins. The hind-wings are very pale yellowish-green.
