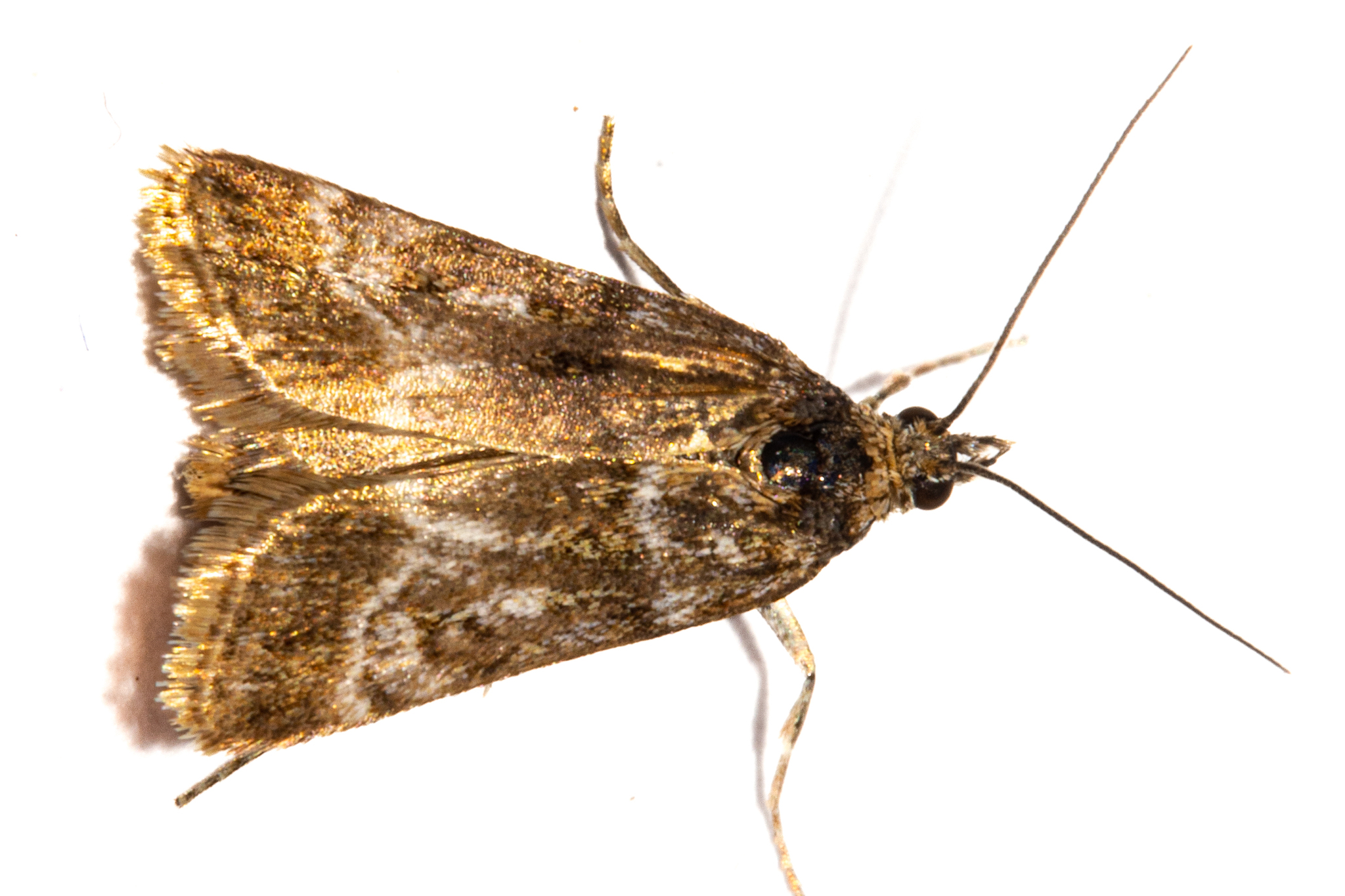

Conservation status
- Data Deficit (NZ TCS)

Scientific classification
- Kingdom: Animalia
- Phylum: Arthropoda
- Clade: Pancrustacea
- Class: Insecta
- Order: Lepidoptera
- Family: Crambidae
- Genus: Scoparia
- Species: S. pascoella

Binomial name
- Scoparia pascoella Philpott, 1920

= Scoparia pascoella =

Species of moth endemic to New Zealand

Scoparia pascoella is a species of moth in the family Crambidae. It is endemic to New Zealand. In 2025 this species was classified as "data deficient" under the New Zealand Threat Classification System.

== Taxonomy ==
This species was described by Alfred Philpott in 1920. However the placement of this species within the genus Scoparia is in doubt. As a result, this species has also been referred to as Scoparia (s.l.) pascoella.

=== Etymology ===
The species is named in honour of Merlin Owen Pasco, a New Zealand entomologist who died in France during the First World War.

== Description ==
The wingspan is 15–18 mm. The forewings are ferruginous-brown mingled with some fuscous and much suffused with white. The first line is white, margined with ferruginous posteriorly. The second line is also white, margined with ferruginous anteriorly. The hindwings are grey-fuscous, but paler anteriorly. Adults have been recorded on wing in December.

== Conservation status ==
In 2025 this species was classified by the New Zealand Department of Conservation as "data deficient" under the New Zealand Threat Classification System. S. pascoella is data poor as a result of difficulties in identifying this species.
