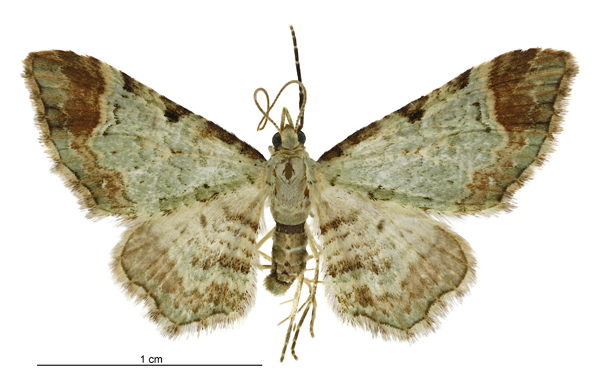
- Female
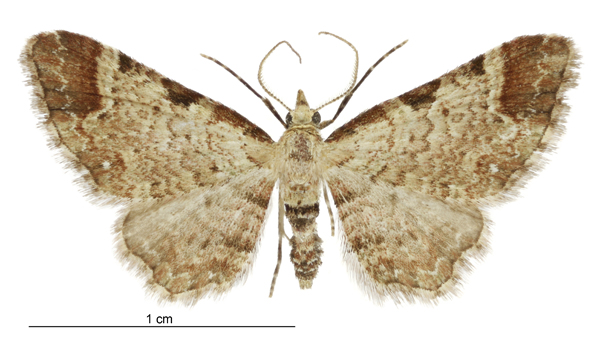
- Male

Scientific classification
- Kingdom: Animalia
- Phylum: Arthropoda
- Class: Insecta
- Order: Lepidoptera
- Family: Geometridae
- Genus: Pasiphila
- Species: P. magnimaculata

Binomial name
- Pasiphila magnimaculata (Philpott, 1915)

Synonyms
- Chloroclystis magnimaculata Philpott, 1915; Chloroclystis rufipellis Meyrick, 1927; Chloroclystis irabunda Prout, 1958

= Pasiphila magnimaculata =

Species of moth endemic to New Zealand

Pasiphila magnimaculata is a moth of the family Geometridae. This species was first described by Alfred Philpott in 1915. It is endemic to New Zealand and has been observed in both the North and South Islands.

== Taxonomy ==
This species was first described by Alfred Philpott in 1915 using specimens collected in Queenstown by Merlin Owen Pasco and originally named Chloroclystis magnimaculata. In 1928 George Hudson illustrated and discussed this species under that name in his book The butterflies and moths of New Zealand. In 1971 John S. Dugdale placed this species in the genus Pasiphila. The male holotype specimen is held at the New Zealand Arthropod Collection.

== Description ==
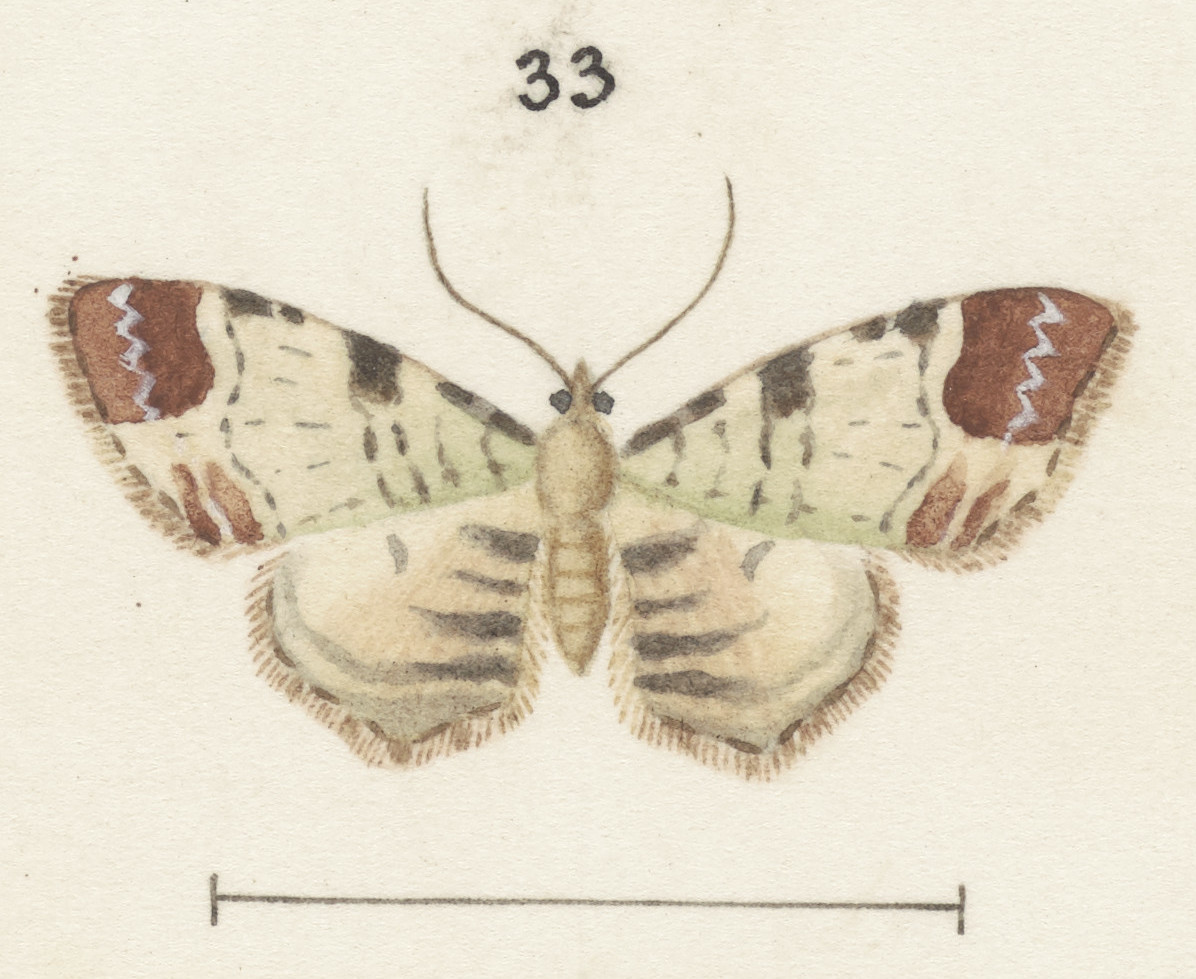
Illustration by Hudson.

Philpott originally described the adults of this species as follows:

♂♀. 19-21 mm. Head, palpi, and thorax greyish-green, in ♀ ochreous. Palpi 2. Antennae in ♂ ciliate-fasciculate, ciliations 4. Abdomen greenish-grey, in ♀ ochreous, with a reddish-fuscous antemedian band. Forewings triangular, costa gently arched, termen subsinuate, moderately oblique ; greyish-green ; costa narrowly reddish to 1/4 ; numerous reddish-fuscous waved lines from base to 3/4 , forming curved fascia at 1/3 ; outer edge of median band broadly and obtusely projecting at middle ; a large apical blotch of bright reddish-fuscous ; a smaller and paler tornal blotch with a minute white dot near centre ; subterminal line serrate, grey-green ; a reddish-fuscous line round termen : cilia greyish-green, suffused with reddish-fuscous except at middle of termen. Hindwings unevenly rounded ; pale greenish-grey ; a reddish-fuscous discal dot and numerous obscure waved reddish-fuscous striae, more prominent on dorsum : cilia greenish-grey with faint reddish-fuscous bars.

This species is very variable in appearance especially with regard to the intensity of colour pattern of specimens.

== Distribution ==
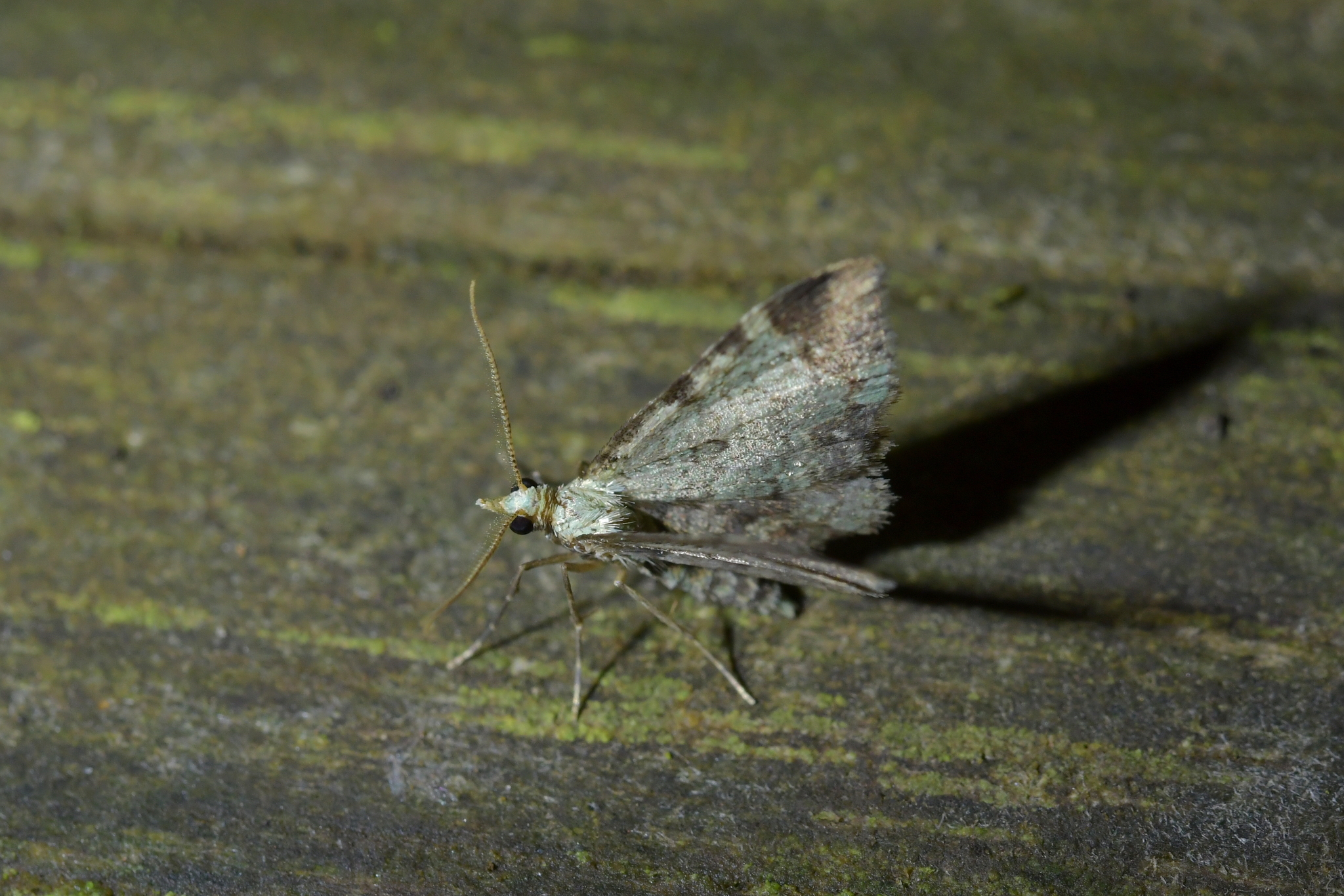
Live specimen

P. magnimaculata is endemic to New Zealand and has been observed in both the North and South Islands including in the Otago region and on Quail Island.

== Habitat and hosts ==
This species usually inhabits montane areas. The larvae feed on the flowers of Gaultheria crassa.

== Behaviour ==
Adults have been observed on the wing from October to February.
