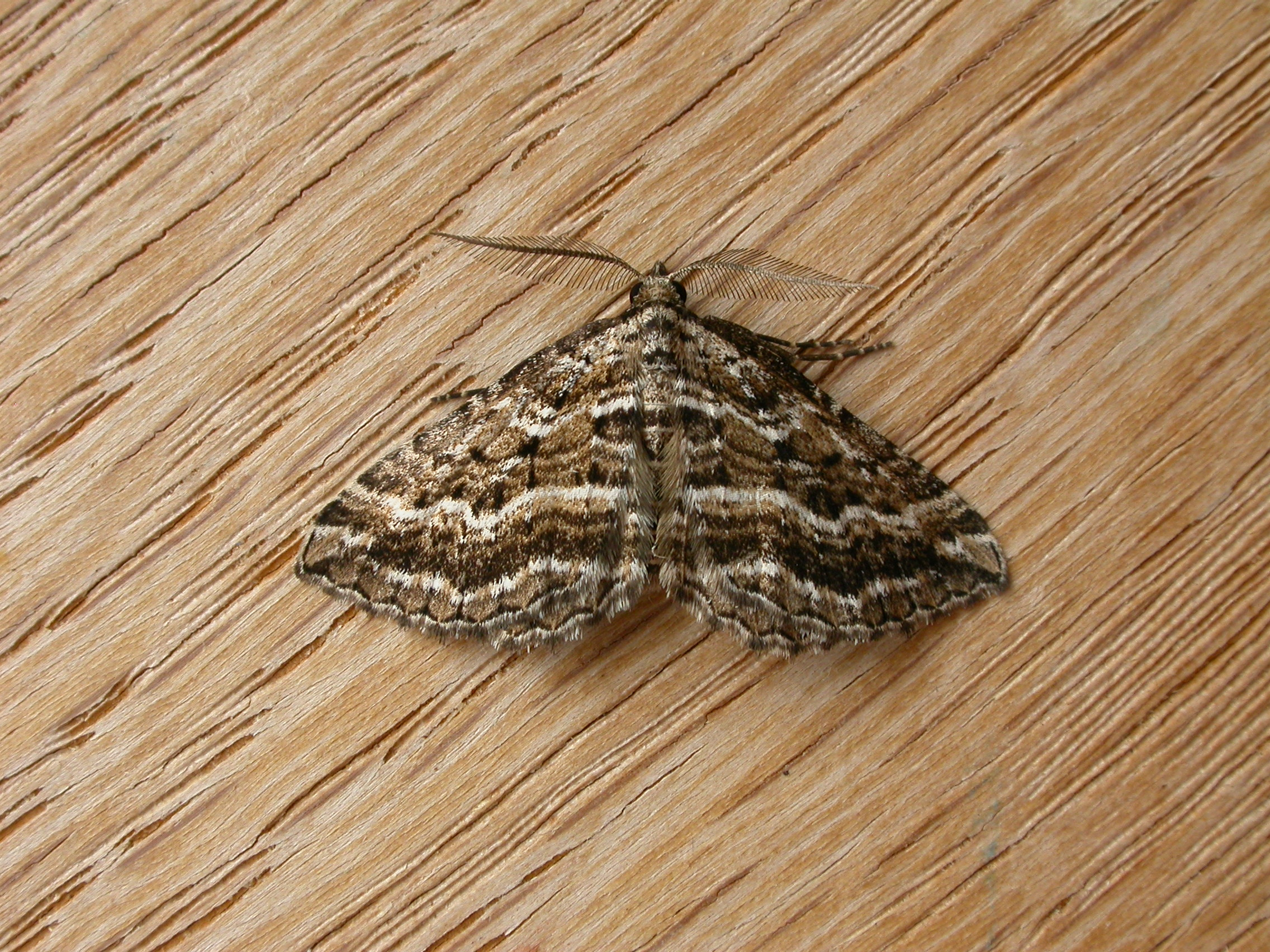

Scientific classification
- Kingdom: Animalia
- Phylum: Arthropoda
- Class: Insecta
- Order: Lepidoptera
- Family: Geometridae
- Subfamily: Larentiinae
- Tribe: Hydriomenini
- Genus: Aponotoreas
- Species: A. epicrossa

Binomial name
- Aponotoreas epicrossa (Meyrick, 1891)

Synonyms
- Xanthorhoe epicrossa Meyrick, 1891

= Aponotoreas epicrossa =

Species of moth

Aponotoreas epicrossa is a moth of the family Geometridae. It is known from Australia, including Tasmania.
