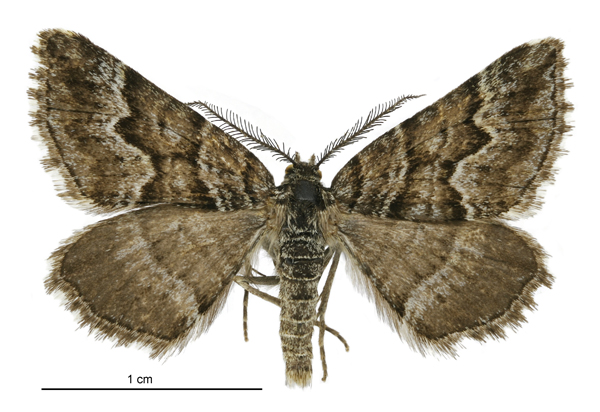
- Male Aponotoreas anthracias

Scientific classification
- Kingdom: Animalia
- Phylum: Arthropoda
- Clade: Pancrustacea
- Class: Insecta
- Order: Lepidoptera
- Family: Geometridae
- Tribe: Hydriomenini
- Genus: Aponotoreas; Craw, 1986

= Aponotoreas =

Genus of geometer moths

Aponotoreas is a genus of moths in the family Geometridae erected by Robin C. Craw in 1986. The type species for this genus is Larentia anthracias by original designation.

== Species ==
- Aponotoreas anthracias (Meyrick, 1883)
- Aponotoreas dissimilis (Philpott, 1914)
- Aponotoreas incompta (Philpott, 1918)
- Aponotoreas insignis (Butler, 1877)
- Aponotoreas orphnaea (Meyrick, 1883)
- Aponotoreas synclinalis (Hudson, 1903)
- Aponotoreas villosa (Philpott, 1917)
- Aponotoreas cheimatobiata (Guenée, 1857)
- Aponotoreas dascia (Turner, 1904)
- Aponotoreas epicrossa (Meyrick, 1891)
- Aponotoreas petrodes (Turner, 1904)
