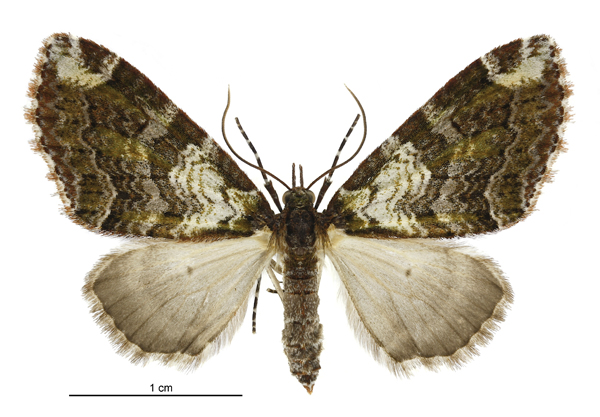
- Female
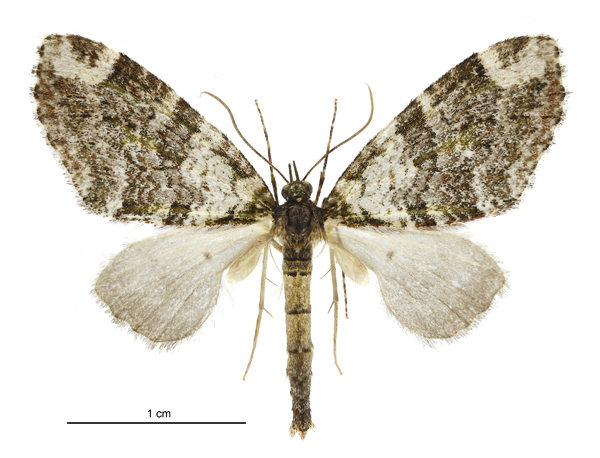
- Male

Scientific classification
- Kingdom: Animalia
- Phylum: Arthropoda
- Class: Insecta
- Order: Lepidoptera
- Family: Geometridae
- Genus: Tatosoma
- Species: T. apicipallida

Binomial name
- Tatosoma apicipallida Prout, 1914

= Tatosoma apicipallida =

Species of moth endemic to New Zealand

Tatosoma apicipallida is a species of moth in the family Geometridae first described by Louis Beethoven Prout in 1914. It is endemic to New Zealand. The larval host plant of this species is unknown. It has been found from Mount Te Aroha southwards.
