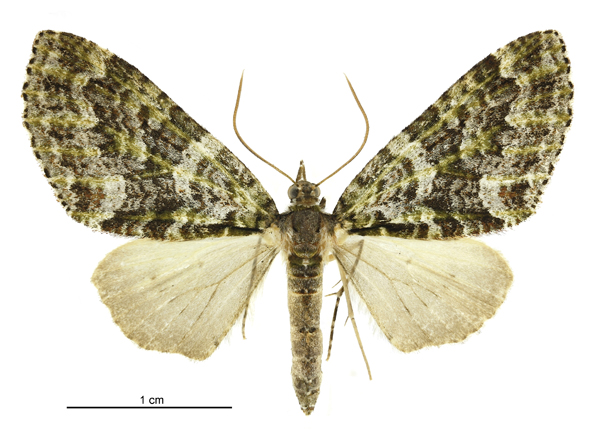
- Female Tatosoma agrionata

Scientific classification
- Kingdom: Animalia
- Phylum: Arthropoda
- Clade: Pancrustacea
- Class: Insecta
- Order: Lepidoptera
- Family: Geometridae
- Subfamily: Larentiinae
- Tribe: Trichopterygini
- Genus: Tatosoma; Butler, 1874

= Tatosoma =

Genus of moths

Tatosoma is a genus of moths in the family Geometridae first described by Arthur Gardiner Butler in 1874. The species in this genus are found only in New Zealand.

== Species ==
Species include:

- Tatosoma agrionata (Walker, 1862)
- Tatosoma alta Philpott, 1913
- Tatosoma apicipallida Prout, 1914
- Tatosoma fasciata Philpott, 1914
- Tatosoma lestevata (Walker, 1862)
- Tatosoma monoviridisata Clarke, 1920
- Tatosoma tipulata (Walker, 1862)
- Tatosoma topea Philpott, 1903
- Tatosoma transitaria (Walker, 1862)
