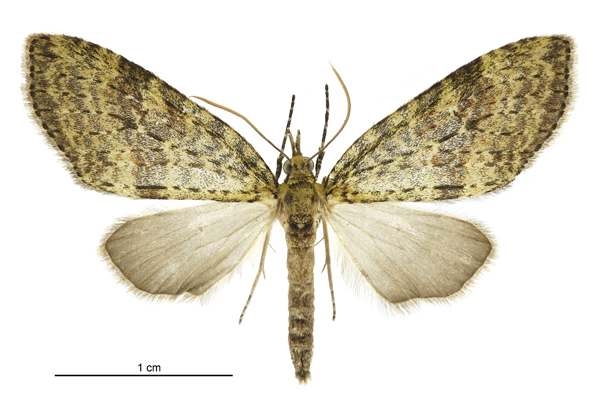
- Female
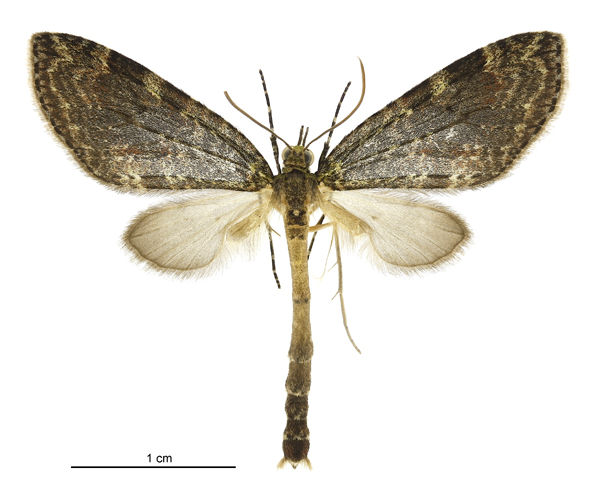
- Male

Scientific classification
- Kingdom: Animalia
- Phylum: Arthropoda
- Class: Insecta
- Order: Lepidoptera
- Family: Geometridae
- Genus: Tatosoma
- Species: T. transitaria

Binomial name
- Tatosoma transitaria (Walker, 1862)

Synonyms
- Cidaria transitaria Walker, 1862; Tatosom timora Meyrick, 1884; Tatosoma transitaria ab. semifasciata Prout, 1958

= Tatosoma transitaria =

Species of moth endemic to New Zealand

Tatosoma transitaria is a species of moth in the family Geometridae first described by Francies Walker in 1862. It is endemic to New Zealand.
