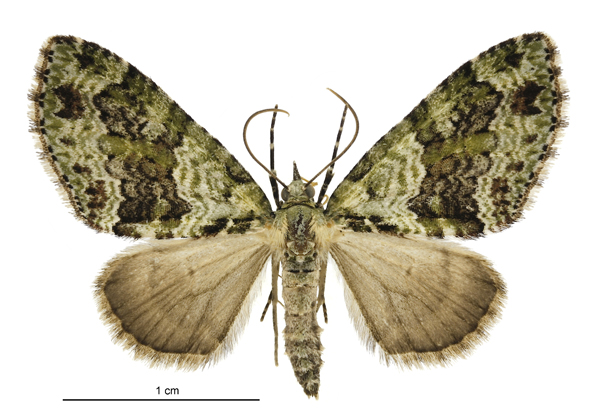
- Female
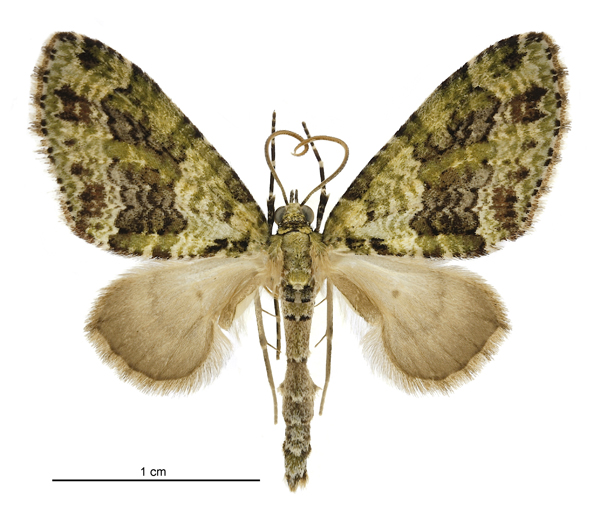
- Male

Scientific classification
- Kingdom: Animalia
- Phylum: Arthropoda
- Class: Insecta
- Order: Lepidoptera
- Family: Geometridae
- Genus: Tatosoma
- Species: T. alta

Binomial name
- Tatosoma alta Philpott, 1913

Synonyms
- Tatosoma nigra Hudson, 1922

= Tatosoma alta =

Species of moth endemic to New Zealand

Tatosoma alta is a species of moth in the family Geometridae first described by Alfred Philpott in 1913. It is endemic to New Zealand.
