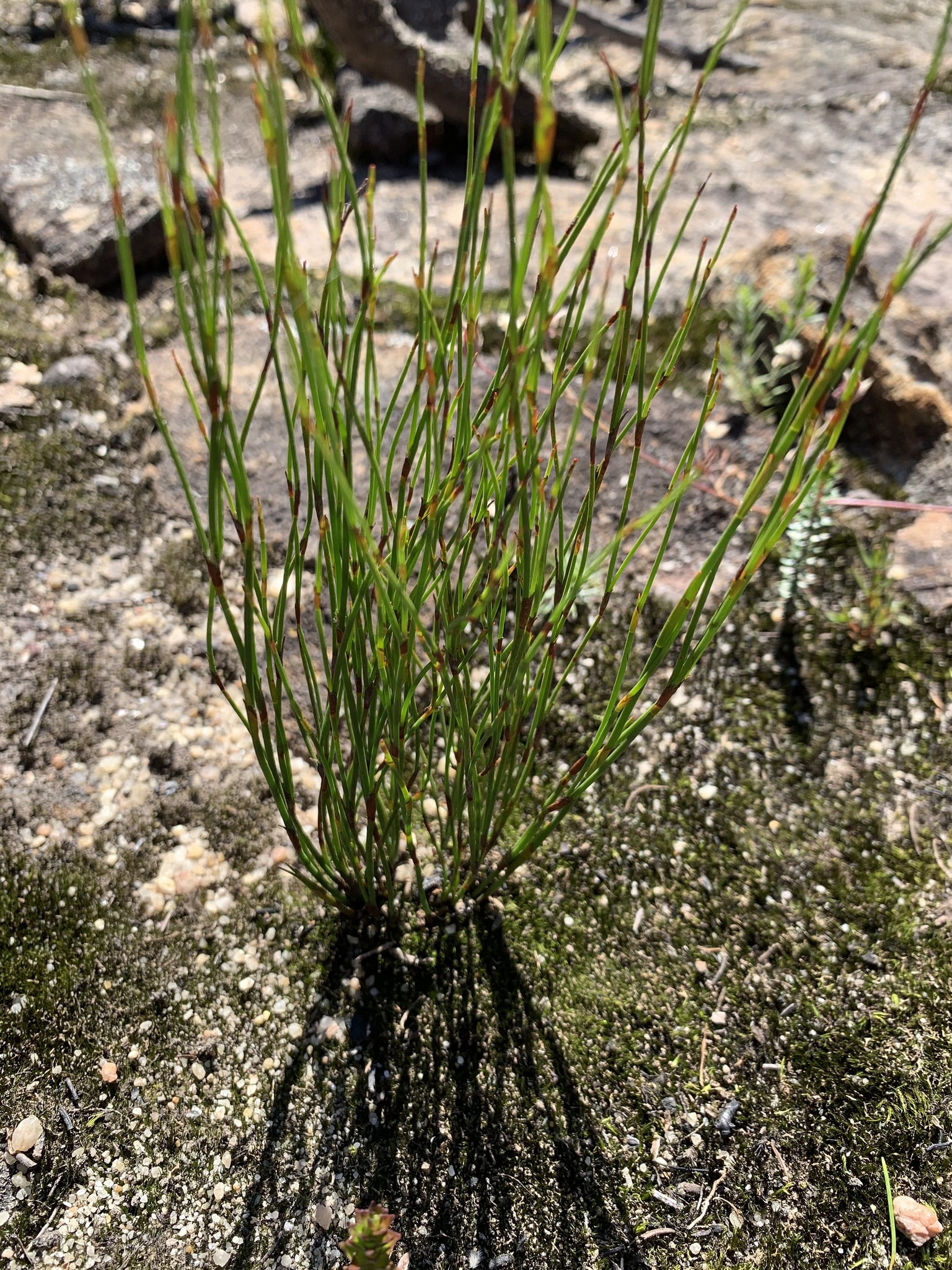

Scientific classification
- Kingdom: Plantae
- Clade: Embryophytes
- Clade: Tracheophytes
- Clade: Spermatophytes
- Clade: Angiosperms
- Clade: Monocots
- Clade: Commelinids
- Order: Poales
- Family: Restionaceae
- Genus: Empodisma
- Species: E. minus

Binomial name
- Empodisma minus (Hook.f.) L.A.S.Johnson & D.F.Cutler

= Empodisma minus =

Species of flowering plant

Empodisma minus, commonly known as (lesser) wire rush or spreading rope-rush, is an Australian perennial evergreen belonging to the southern-hemisphere family of monocotyledonous plants Restionaceae. The Latin name Empodisma minus translates to “tangle-foot” “small”. E. minus is found from Queensland to South Australia, Tasmania and throughout New Zealand south of 38 ° latitude, or the central north island. Its current conservation status is “Least concern”. In 2012, the new species Empodisma robustum was described in New Zealand, with what was previously described as E. minus from the lowland raised bogs of Waikato and Northland now being re-classified as E. robustum. E. minus remains an important peatformer in the south of New Zealand and in high altitude peatlands.

== Description ==
The stems are 15–200 cm long, numerously branched, semi-terete and dark green to dark brown in colour. The stem keeps upright when short, yet becomes procumbent when tall. The stem has 5.5–12 mm long sheaths that seemingly divide it to multiple segments. The sheaths are reduced leaves which keep close to the stem and have whitish axillary hairs. Spikelets, the primary inflorescence of the grass, are usually solitary and sessile in males and females, however, axillary in the males but in the upper axils in the females. The fruit of E. minus is a hard oval nut, sessile and approximately 2 mm long. The plant has a robust rhizome with a diameter of about 8 mm and numerous roots that ascend horizontally.

E. minus flowers from August until December, the flowers are yellow in colour. Fruit appears from November up to March.

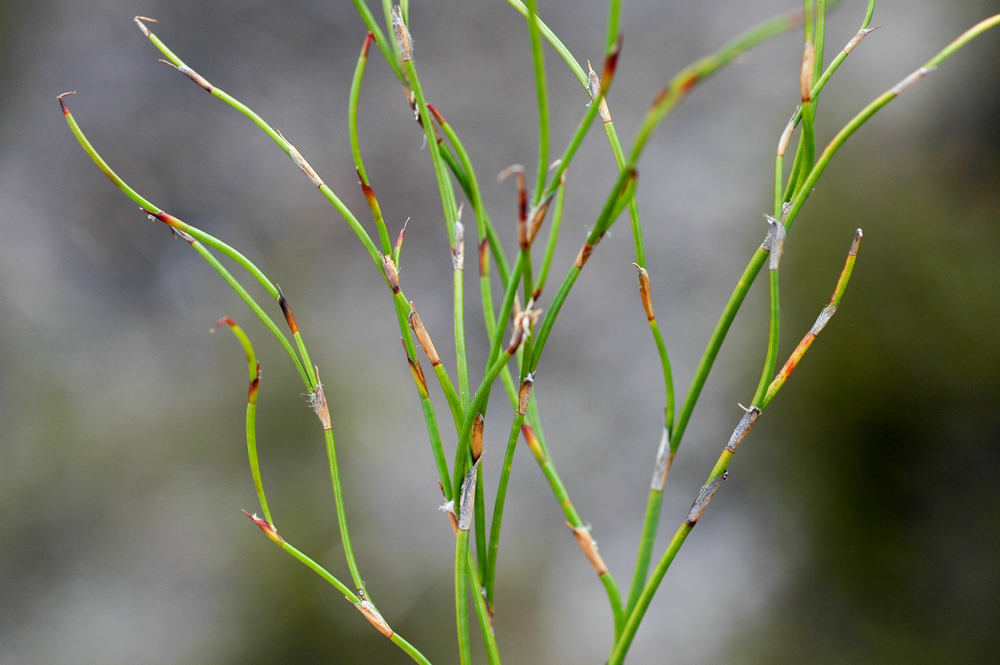
A close up of Empodisma minus showing its stem, sheaths (reduced leaves) and white axillary hairs

== Distribution and habitat ==
Empodisma minus is found most densely in the South-Eastern parts of Australia, also in Tasmania and only absent from Western Australia and the Northern Territory. The species is also present in New Zealand. In both regions it grows from coastal to alpine areas, preferring fens, bogs, heaths, swamps and stream margins.

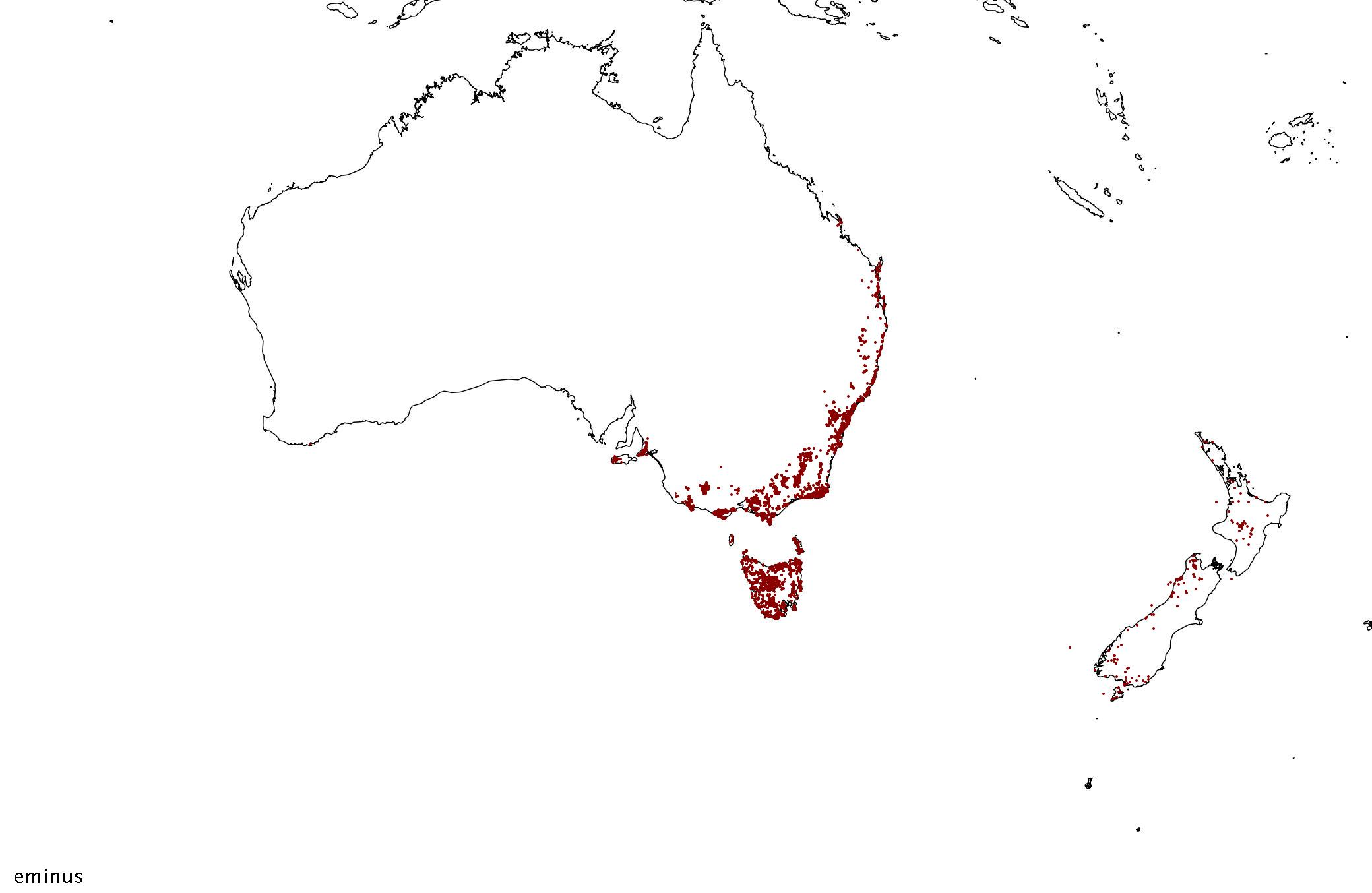
The distribution of Empodisma minus in Australia and New Zealand

== Ecology ==
The Restionaceae, which includes the family Empodisma, withstands nutrient poor soils and seasonal drought. E. minus can also experience occasional fires which can be detrimental, yet the plant is able to resprout, although slowly.

In New Zealand, the species commonly grows in a thick carpet together with, for example, Leptospermum scoparium (heath shrub), Baumea teretifolia (sedge), Gleichenia dicarpa and Gleichenia microphylla (ferns) and Sphagnum cristatum (moss). Empodisma minus has been classified as the dominant species in the ombrotrophic mires of New Zealand, mainly due to its high peat-forming ability and could even be called an ecosystem engineer for fen-to-bog transitions.

In Australia, Empodisma minus is associated with Richea continentis and Baeckea gunniana (shrubs), Gleichenia alpina (fern), Sphagnum cristatum (moss) and Astelia alpina (monocotyledonous herb). The dry seasons contribute to decomposition and limited peat formation, whereas the wet seasons boost the plant’s root growth and peat accumulation.

Empodisma minus is also the host plant for the larvae of the endemic New Zealand species of moth Aponotoreas synclinalis.
