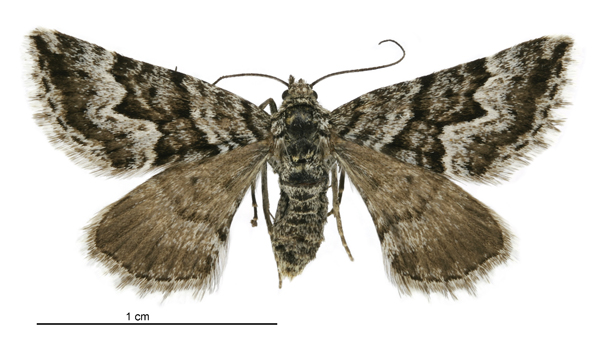
- Female specimen
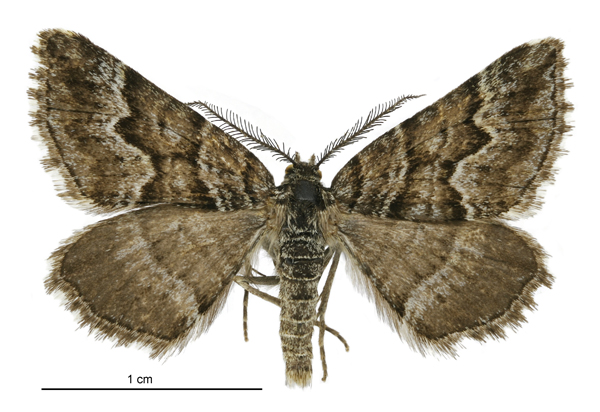
- Male specimen

Scientific classification
- Kingdom: Animalia
- Phylum: Arthropoda
- Clade: Pancrustacea
- Class: Insecta
- Order: Lepidoptera
- Family: Geometridae
- Subfamily: Larentiinae
- Tribe: Hydriomenini
- Genus: Aponotoreas
- Species: A. anthracias

Binomial name
- Aponotoreas anthracias (Meyrick, 1883)

Synonyms
- Larentia anthracias Meyrick, 1883; Xanthorhoe anthracias (Meyrick, 1883); Notoreas anthracias (Meyrick, 1883)

= Aponotoreas anthracias =

Species of moth endemic to New Zealand

Aponotoreas anthracias is a moth of the family Geometridae. This species was first described by Edward Meyrick in 1883. It is endemic to New Zealand and is found in the South Island. where it can seen in alpine and subalpine areas of the regions of Canterbury, Otago and Southland. The larval host plants of this moth are species in the genus Dracophyllum. Adults are day flying and are on the wing from September to March. They feed from and likely pollinate the flowers of Dracophyllum pronum.

== Taxonomy ==
Illustration by Hudson.

This species was first described by Edward Meyrick in 1883 under the name Larentia anthracias. For this description Meyrick used 12 male specimens collected at up to 5,400 feet (1,600 m) at Mount Hutt and Lake Whakatipu in December and January. Meyrick gave a fuller description of the species in 1884. In 1898 George Hudson discussed this species in his book New Zealand moths and butterflies (Macro-lepidoptera) under the name Xanthorhoe anthracias. In 1917 Meyrick placed this species in the genus Notoreas. Hudson, following Meyrick, discussed and illustrated this species under the name Notoreas anthracias in his 1928 book The butterflies and moths of New Zealand. In 1986 Robin C. Craw placed this species in the newly described genus Aponotoreas. Larentia anthracias is the type species for Aponotoreas. This placement was accepted by John S. Dugdale in 1988.

The male lectotype specimen, collected near Lake Wakatipu by Meyrick, is held at the Natural History Museum, London.

== Description ==
Meyrick described the male of the species as follows:

Male.—24-25 mm. Forewings moderate, hindmargin sinuate; dark fuscous, faintly striated, more or less sprinkled with whitish; a curved blackish line near base, posteriorly obscurely whitish-margined; a curved obscure whitish fascia at 1/3, blackish-margined and bisected by a blackish line; a well-defined black discal dot; a white fascia, partially mixed with fuscous, beyond middle, anteriorly strongly blackish-margined, posteriorly more obscurely, and bisected by a blackish line, somewhat irregular, moderately angulated in middle; an obscure dentate yellowish or whitish subterminal line; an interrupted black hindmarginal line. Hindwings moderate, hindmargin rounded; dark fuscous; two nearly straight lines before middle faintly darker; a faint paler or sometimes whitish sinuate fascia beyond middle, margined and bisected with darker.

Meyrick pointed out that specimens could vary in the distinctiveness of the white markings. The zigzag patterns on the wings of this moth assist it in camouflaging itself when at rest on stones and rocks.

== Distribution ==
A. anthracias is endemic to New Zealand. It is found only in the South Island and is widespread in the montane and subalpine areas of the Canterbury, Otago and Southland regions. Specimens have been collected in the Maungatua ranges, the Remarkables and the Hawkdun Ecological District.

== Habitat and hosts ==
This species frequents alpine and subalpine habitat and can be observed on open mountainsides at altitudes of between 2,000 feet (610 m) and 5,400 feet (1,600 m). The larval host plants of this moth are species in the genus Dracophyllum.

== Behaviour ==
The adults are day flying and are most commonly observed on the wing between September and March. Adults have been shown to feed from and likely pollinate the flowers of Dracophyllum pronum.

== Gallery ==
Live specimen

At rest on rocks

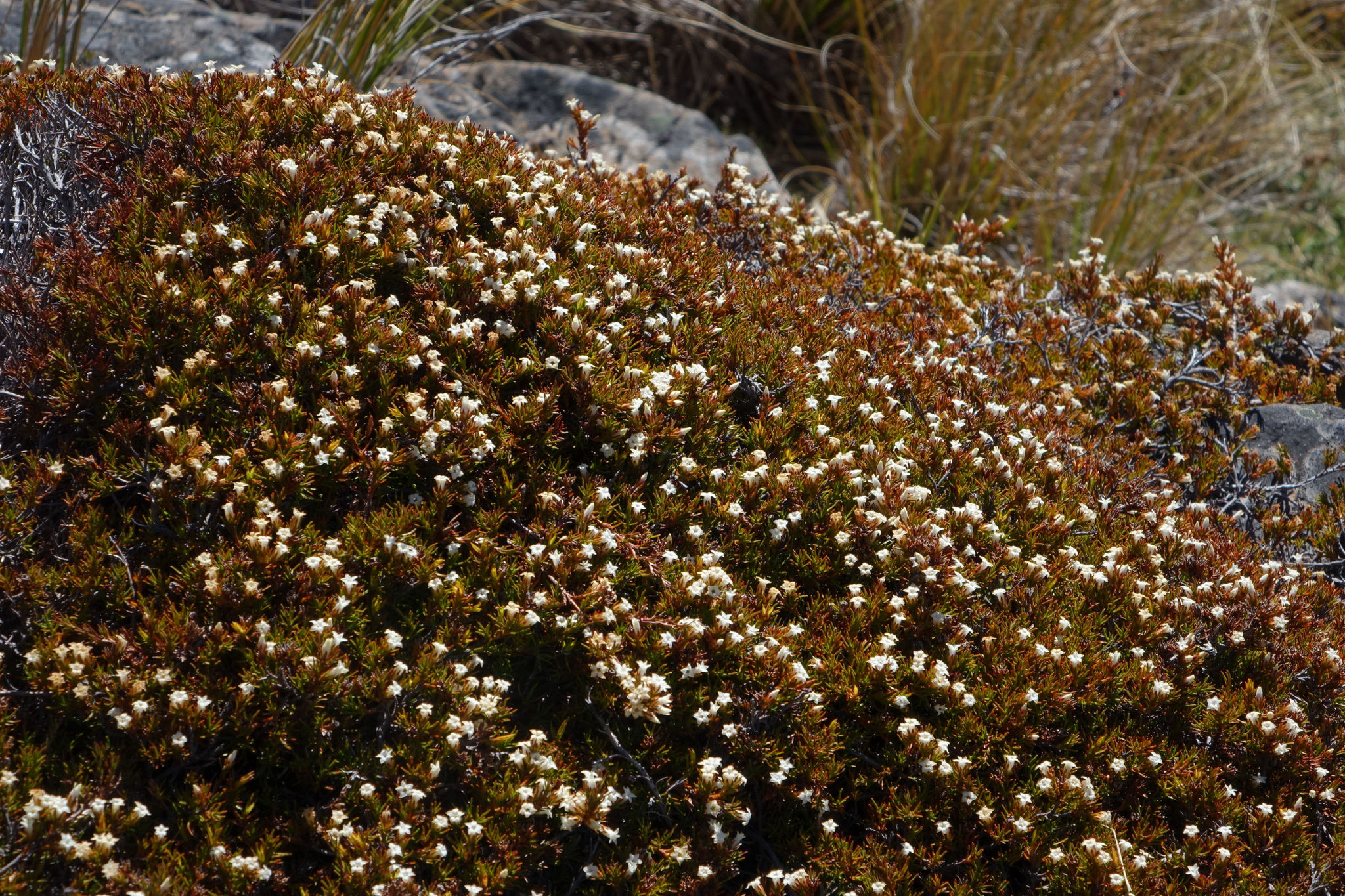
Dracophyllum pronum at Ahuriri Conservation Park
