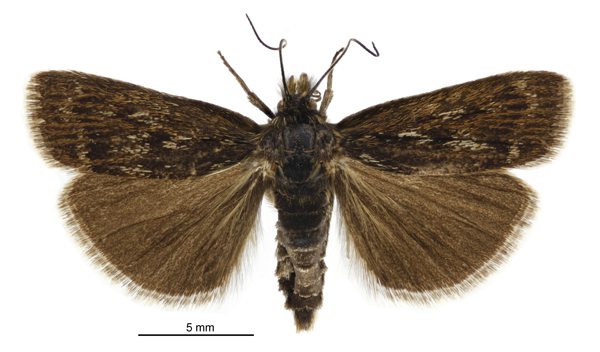
- Male
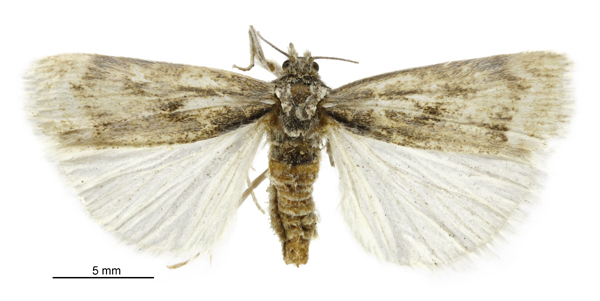
- Female

Scientific classification
- Kingdom: Animalia
- Phylum: Arthropoda
- Clade: Pancrustacea
- Class: Insecta
- Order: Lepidoptera
- Family: Crambidae
- Subfamily: Crambinae
- Tribe: Crambini
- Genus: Orocrambus
- Species: O. cultus

Binomial name
- Orocrambus cultus Philpott, 1917

= Orocrambus cultus =

Species of moth

Orocrambus cultus is a moth in the family Crambidae. It was first described by Alfred Philpott in 1917 from specimens collected by Merlin Owen Pasco. It is endemic to New Zealand, where it is known from Cecil Peak.

The wingspan is about 20 mm. The forewings are deep yellowish brown with dusky black markings on the costa and dorsum. Adults have been recorded on wing in January.
