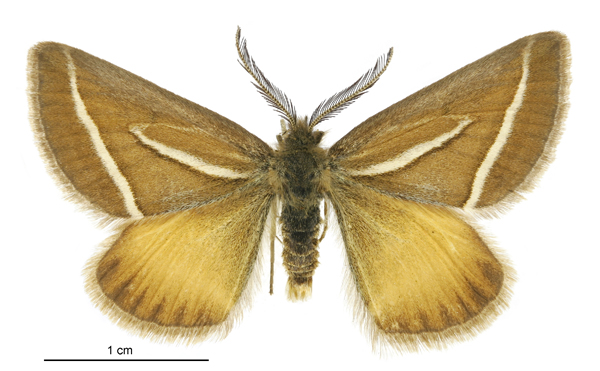
- Male specimen
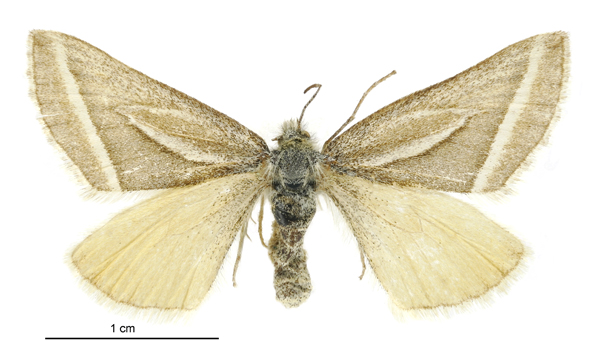
- Female specimen

Scientific classification
- Kingdom: Animalia
- Phylum: Arthropoda
- Class: Insecta
- Order: Lepidoptera
- Family: Geometridae
- Subfamily: Larentiinae
- Tribe: Hydriomenini
- Genus: Aponotoreas
- Species: A. insignis

Binomial name
- Aponotoreas insignis (Butler, 1877)

Synonyms
- Aspilates insignis Butler, 1877; Notoreas insignis Butler, 1877)

= Aponotoreas insignis =

Species of moth

Aponotoreas insignis (also known as the Alpine grassland orange) is a moth of the family Geometridae. It is endemic to New Zealand.

== Taxonomy ==
This species was first described by Arthur Gardiner Butler in 1877 from specimens collected by James Hector and John Enys. Butler originally named the species Aspilates insignis. In 1986 Robin C. Craw described the new genus Aponotoreas and included A. insignis within it.

== Behaviour ==
This moth is day flying. Adults of the species can be found on the wing between January and March.

== Habitat and hosts ==
A. insignis prefers to inhabit tussock land on the mountain sides of the South Island. Larvae exist on species of Chionochloa and Poa.
