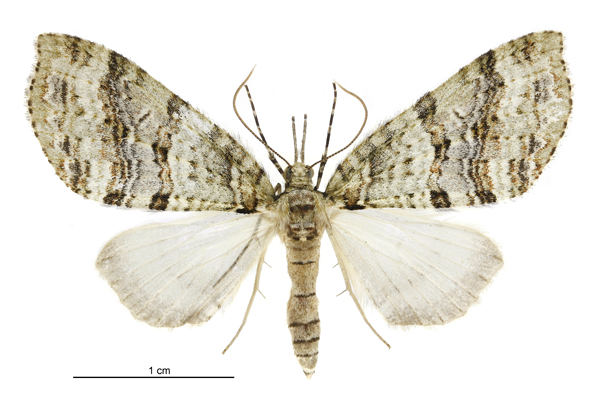
- Female
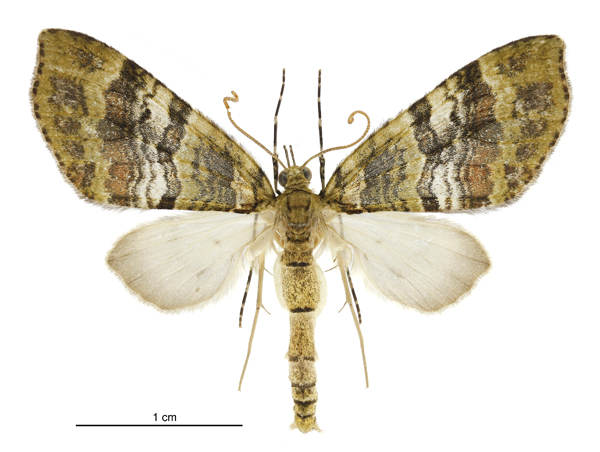
- Male

Scientific classification
- Kingdom: Animalia
- Phylum: Arthropoda
- Class: Insecta
- Order: Lepidoptera
- Family: Geometridae
- Genus: Tatosoma
- Species: T. fasciata

Binomial name
- Tatosoma fasciata Philpott, 1914

= Tatosoma fasciata =

Species of moth endemic to New Zealand

Tatosoma fasciata is a species of moth in the family Geometridae first described by Alfred Philpott in 1914. It is endemic to New Zealand. This moth has been observed at Mount Te Aroha, which is possibly the northern most location this species is found. The larval host plant of this species is Lophozonia menziesii.
