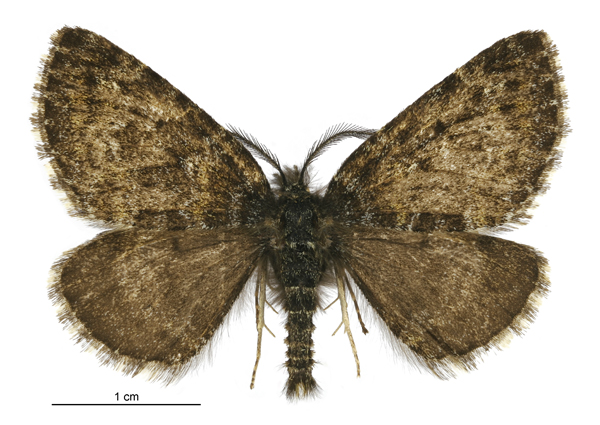
- Male specimen
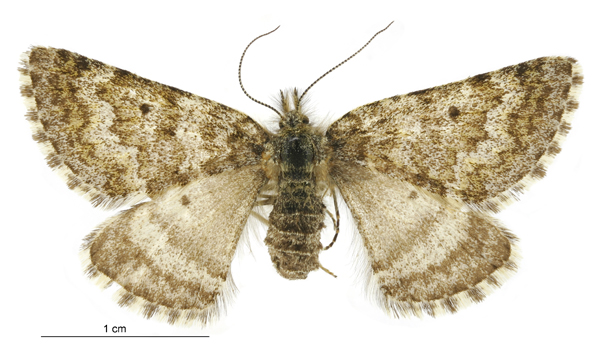
- Female specimen

Scientific classification
- Kingdom: Animalia
- Phylum: Arthropoda
- Clade: Pancrustacea
- Class: Insecta
- Order: Lepidoptera
- Family: Geometridae
- Subfamily: Larentiinae
- Tribe: Hydriomenini
- Genus: Aponotoreas
- Species: A. orphnaea

Binomial name
- Aponotoreas orphnaea (Meyrick, 1883)

Synonyms
- Pasithea orphnaea Meyrick, 1883; Notoreas orphnaea (Meyrick, 1883)

= Aponotoreas orphnaea =

Species of moth

Aponotoreas orphnaea is a moth of the family Geometridae. This species was first described by Edward Meyrick in 1883. It is endemic to New Zealand.

== Taxonomy ==
This species was first described by Edward Meyrick in 1883 as Pasithea orphnaea. Meyrick collected the type specimen of A. orphnaea in January of that year near the summit of Ben Lomond at 1700 metres. This moth subsequently became known as Notoreas orphnaea after Meyrick renamed the genus Pasithea as Notoreas when he became aware of that Pasithea was preoccupied. In 1986 R. C. Craw described the new genus Aponotoreas and included A. orphnaea within it.

== Distribution and habitat ==
A. orphnaea has been observed in the high alpine zone of Central Otago in wetland habitat. A. orphnaea has also been found in alpine grassland habitat. It is regarded as being locally common on land covered by Mount Aspiring Station.
