= Aphelia =

Aphelia may refer to:

- Aphelia (moth), a genus of moths in the Tortricidae
- Aphelia (plant), a genus of plants in the Centrolepidaceae
- Aphelia, a character in The Fatal Contract, a play by William Heminges
- Aphelia, an album by German rock band Scream Silence
- Aphelia (rhetoric), the plainness in writing or speech
- the plural of aphelion, the point in a solar orbit most distant from the sun
