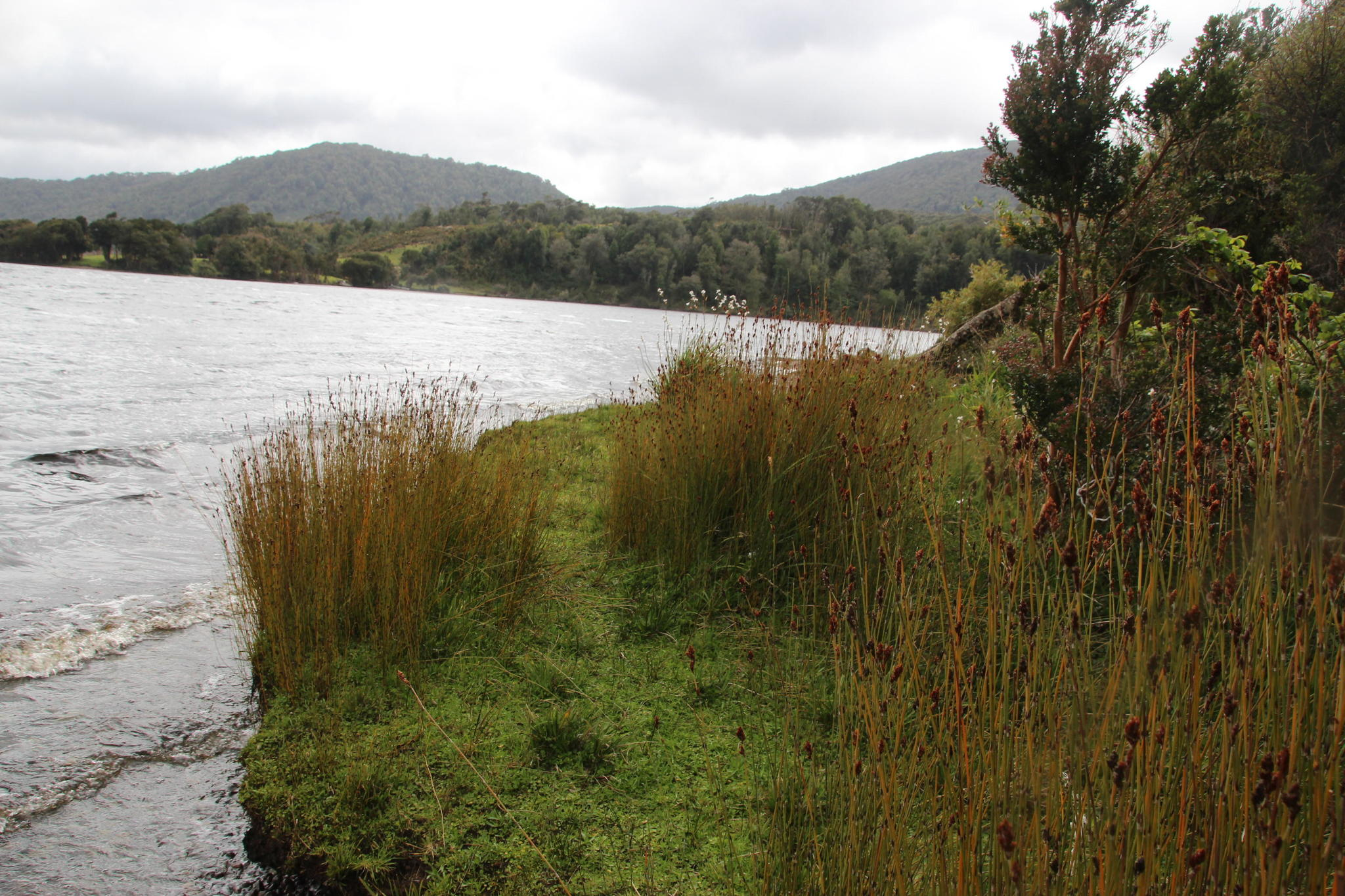

Scientific classification
- Kingdom: Plantae
- Clade: Tracheophytes
- Clade: Angiosperms
- Clade: Monocots
- Clade: Commelinids
- Order: Poales
- Family: Restionaceae
- Genus: Apodasmia
- Species: A. chilensis

Binomial name
- Apodasmia chilensis (Gay) B.G.Briggs & L.A.S.Johnson

Synonyms
- Leptocarpus chilensis (Gay) Mast.; Schoenodum chilense Gay; Calopsis chilensis Steud.

= Apodasmia chilensis =

Species of flowering plant

Apodasmia chilensis is a species of flowering plant in the family Restionaceae. It is endemic to southern Chile and it is the only species in the Restionaceae native to the Americas alongside Gaimardia australis.
