= Centrolepidaceae =

Family of flowering plants

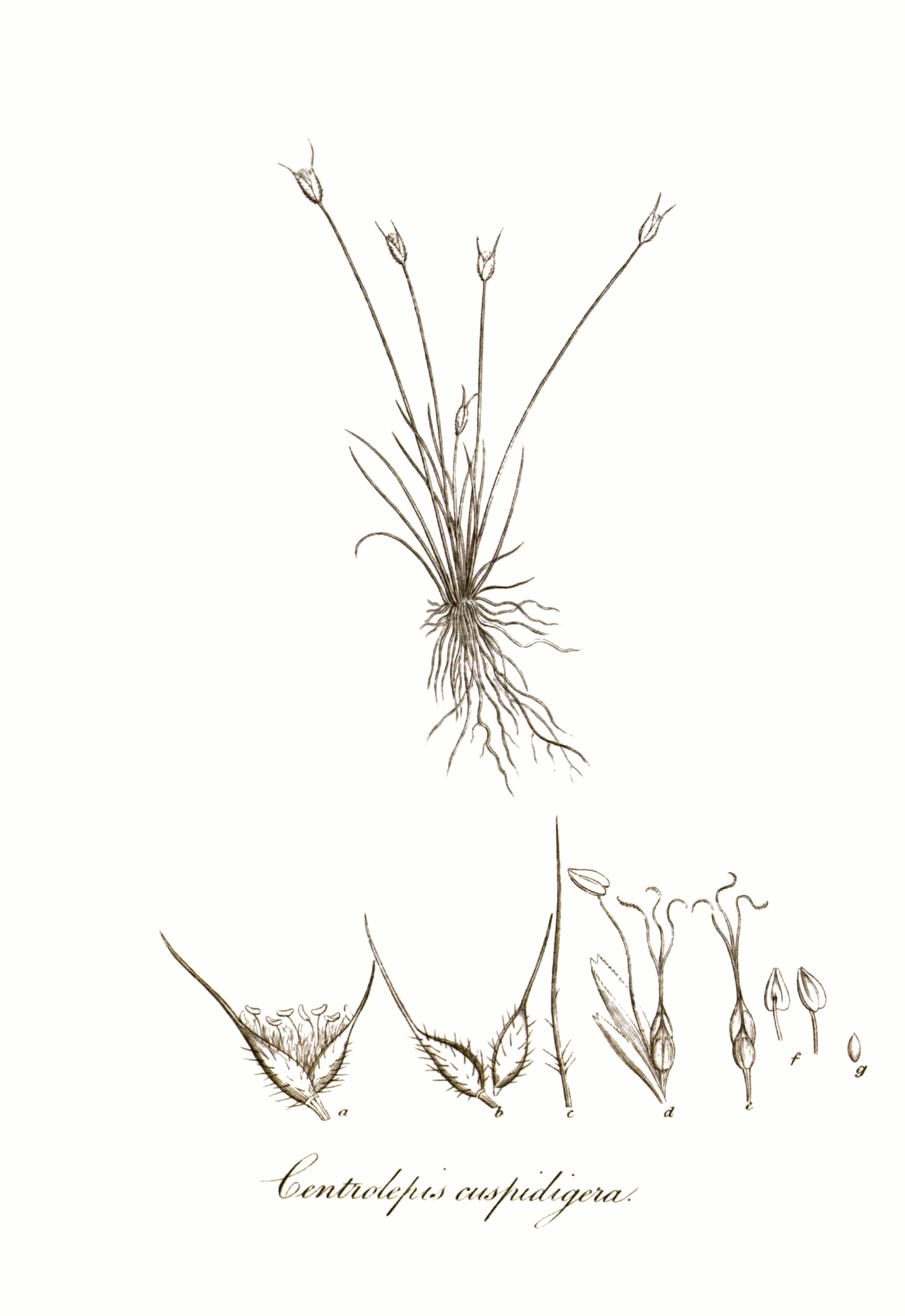
Centrolepis cuspidigera

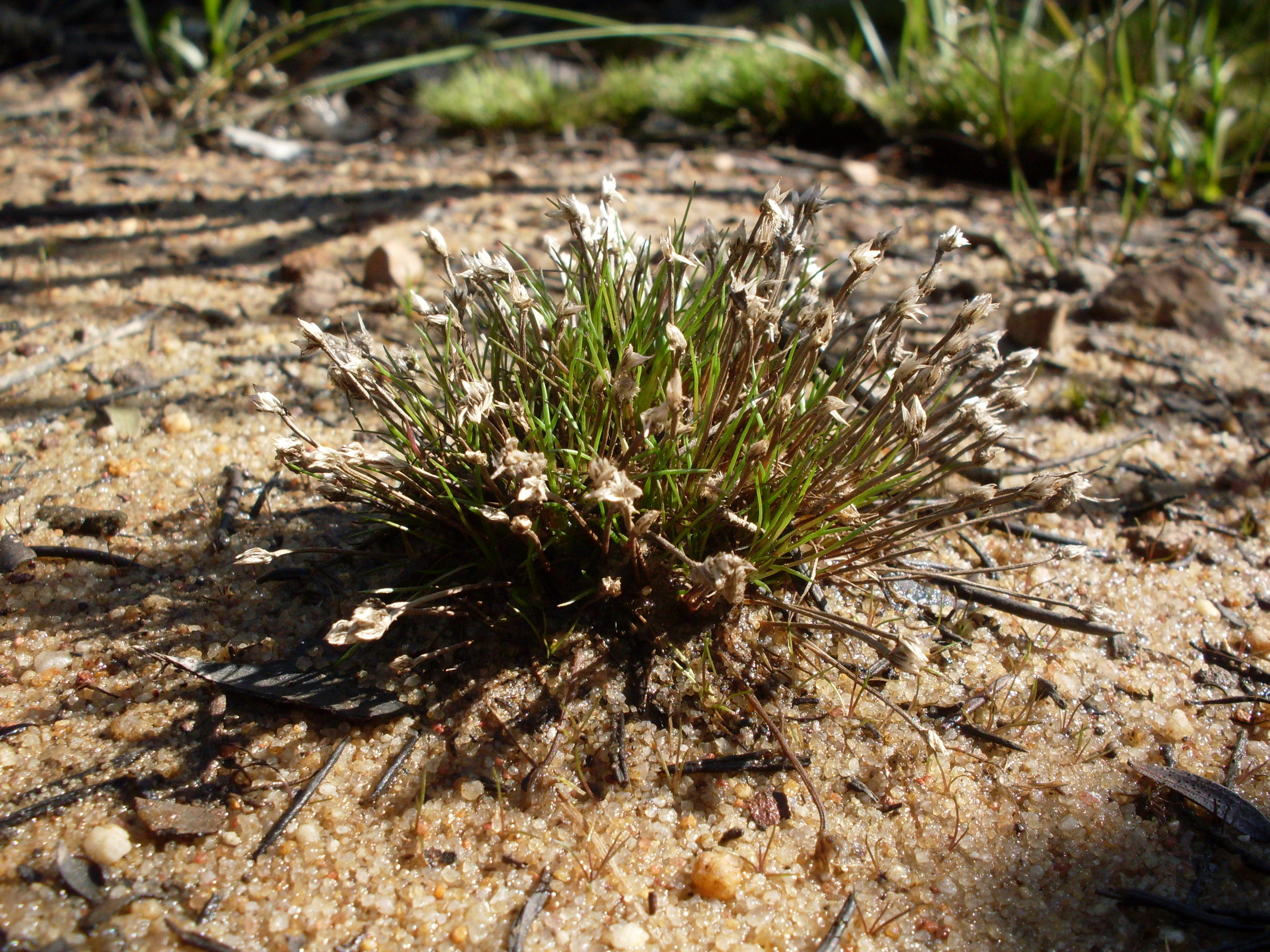
Centrolepis fascicularis

Centrolepidaceae was a family of flowering plants now included in Restionaceae following APG IV (2016). The botanical name has been recognized by most taxonomists.

The APG III system of 2009 recognized the family, as did the APG II system of 2003 and the APG system of 1998), and assigned it to the order Poales in the clade commelinids in the monocots.

The family was regarded as containing three genera, Aphelia, Centrolepis, and Gaimardia, with about 35 species total, found in Australia, New Zealand, southern South America and Southeast Asia.
