= Centrolepis mutica =

Scientific classification
- Kingdom: Plantae
- Clade: Tracheophytes
- Clade: Angiosperms
- Clade: Monocots
- Clade: Commelinids
- Order: Poales
- Family: Restionaceae
- Genus: Centrolepis
- Species: C. mutica

Binomial name
- Centrolepis mutica (R.Br.) Hieron.

Species of grass

Centrolepis mutica is a species of plant in the Restionaceae family and is found in Western Australia.

The annual herb has a slender habit and typically grows to a height of approximately 3 to 7 centimetres (1.18 to 2.76 in). It blooms between November and December producing green flowers.

It is found in winter wet areas along the west coast in the Wheatbelt, South West and Peel regions of Western Australia where it grows in sandy-clay soils.
