= Centrolepis exserta =

Scientific classification
- Kingdom: Plantae
- Clade: Tracheophytes
- Clade: Angiosperms
- Clade: Monocots
- Clade: Commelinids
- Order: Poales
- Family: Restionaceae
- Genus: Centrolepis
- Species: C. exserta

Binomial name
- Centrolepis exserta (R.Br.) Roem. & Schult.

Species of grass

Centrolepis exserta is a species of plant in the Restionaceae family and is found in Western Australia.

The reddish annual herb has a tufted habit and typically grows to a height of 2 to 15 centimetres (0.79 to 5.91 in). It blooms between April and August producing green-red-brown coloured flowers.

It is found along the margins of watercourses, waterholes and seepage areas in the Kimberley region of Western Australia where it grows in damp sandy soils over laterite.
