= Centrolepis alepyroides =

Scientific classification
- Kingdom: Plantae
- Clade: Tracheophytes
- Clade: Angiosperms
- Clade: Monocots
- Clade: Commelinids
- Order: Poales
- Family: Restionaceae
- Genus: Centrolepis
- Species: C. alepyroides

Binomial name
- Centrolepis alepyroides (Nees) Walp.

Species of grass

Centrolepis alepyroides is a species of plant in the Restionaceae family and is found in Western Australia.

The red coloured annual herb has a tufted habit and typically grows to a height of 1.5 to 6 centimetres (0.6 to 2.4 in). It blooms between September and November.

It is found among granite outcrops and in beds of moss in the Wheatbelt, South West and Great Southern regions of Western Australia where it grows in damp sandy soils.
