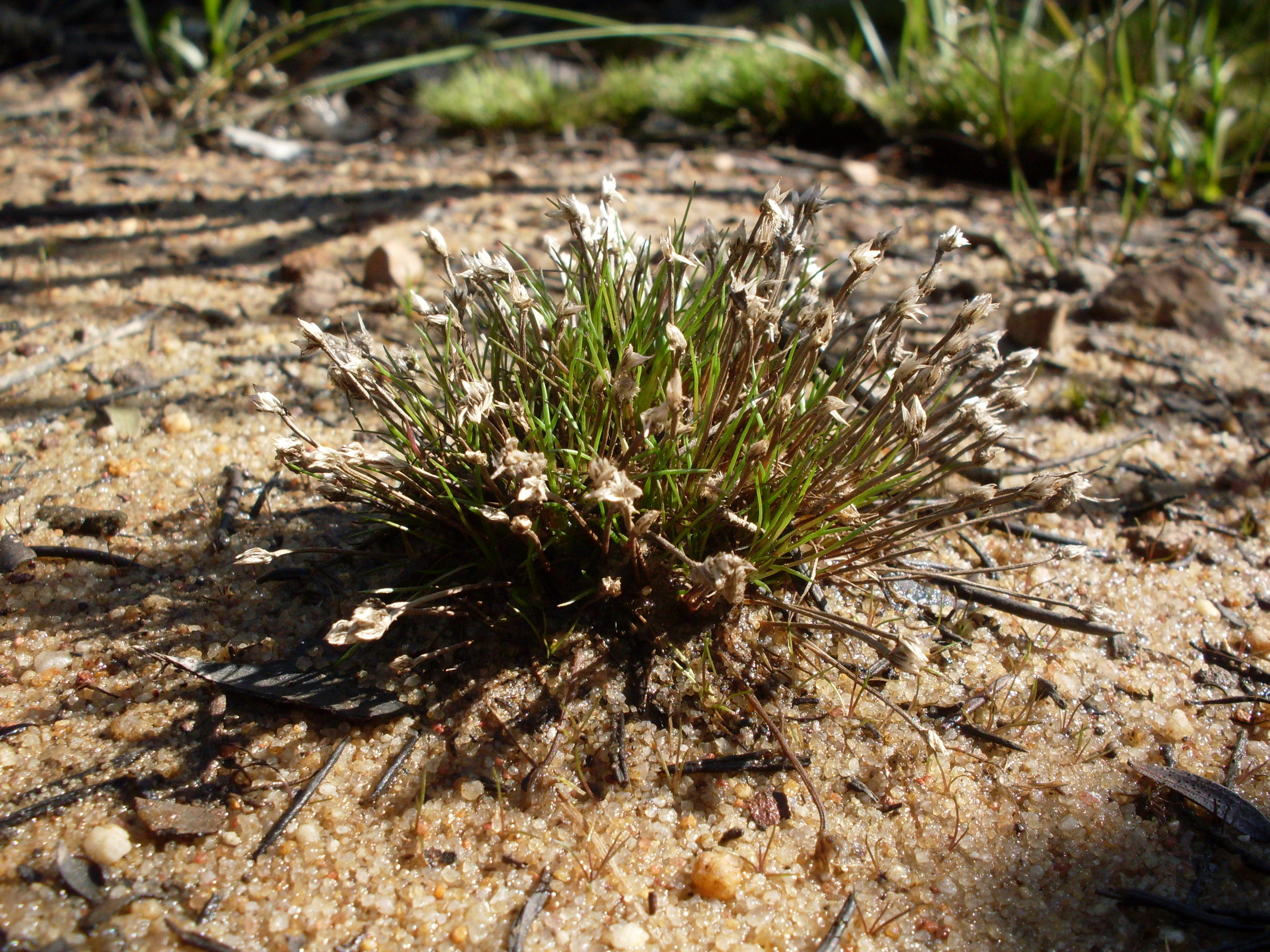
- Centrolepis fascicularis

Scientific classification
- Kingdom: Plantae
- Clade: Tracheophytes
- Clade: Angiosperms
- Clade: Monocots
- Clade: Commelinids
- Order: Poales
- Family: Restionaceae
- Genus: Centrolepis; Labillardiere

Synonyms
- Devauxia R.Br; Alepyrum B.Br.; Alepyrum Hieron. 1873 not R. Br. 1810; Pseudalepyrum Dandy

= Centrolepis =

Genus of flowering plants

Centrolepis is a genus of small herbaceous plants in the family Restionaceae known as thorn grass scales, with about 25 species native to Australia, New Zealand, New Guinea, and south-east Asia as far north as Hainan Dao. APG III system classifies this genus in the Centrolepidaceae family.

Centrolepis species are all tufted plants with narrow leaves from the base. Flowers are tiny and wind-pollinated, in highly condensed inflorescences enclosed between a pair of bracts that often have leaf-like points.

Species

- Centrolepis alepyroides (Nees) Walp. - Avon + Darling in Western Australia
- Centrolepis aristata (R.Br.) Roem. & Schult. - Western Australia, South Australia, Tasmania, Victoria, New South Wales
- Centrolepis banksii (R.Br.) Roem. & Schult. - Western Australia, Northern Territory, Queensland, Hainan, Thailand, Vietnam, Cambodia
- Centrolepis caespitosa D.A.Cooke - Western Australia
- Centrolepis cambodiana Hance - Laos, Vietnam, Cambodia
- Centrolepis cephaloformis Reader - Western Australia, South Australia, Victoria
- Centrolepis ciliata (Hook.f.) Druce - New Zealand (North & South Is., Auckland Islands, Campbell Island)
- Centrolepis curta D.A.Cooke - Western Australia
- Centrolepis drummondiana (Nees) Walp - Western Australia, possibly South Australia
- Centrolepis eremica D.A.Cooke - Western Australia, South Australia, New South Wales, Northern Territory
- Centrolepis exserta (R.Br.) Roem. & Schult. - Western Australia, Northern Territory, Queensland
- Centrolepis fascicularis Labill. - Australia (all 6 states but not NT), New Guinea, Sumatra, New Zealand (recorded once)
- Centrolepis glabra (F.Muell. ex Sond.) Hieron. - New Zealand South Island, Western Australia, South Australia, Tasmania, Victoria, New South Wales
- Centrolepis humillima F.Muell. ex Benth. - Western Australia
- Centrolepis inconspicua W.Fitzg. - Avon + Darling in Western Australia
- Centrolepis milleri M.D.Barrett & D.D.Sokoloff - Western Australia
- Centrolepis monogyna (Hook.f.) Benth. - Tasmania
- Centrolepis muscoides (Hook.f.) Hieron. - Tasmania
- Centrolepis mutica (R.Br.) Hieron. - Darling in Western Australia
- Centrolepis pallida (Hook.f.) Cheeseman - New Zealand (North & South Islands, Auckland Islands, Campbell Island)
- Centrolepis pedderensis W.M.Curtis - Tasmania
- Centrolepis philippinensis Merr. - Borneo, Philippines, Sulawesi, New Guinea
- Centrolepis pilosa Hieron. - Western Australia
- Centrolepis polygyna (R.Br.) Hieron. - Western Australia, South Australia, Tasmania, Victoria, New South Wales
- Centrolepis racemosa D.D.Sokoloff & Remizowa - Northern Territory
- Centrolepis strigosa (R.Br.) Roem. & Schult. - Australia (all 6 states but not NT), New Zealand;
