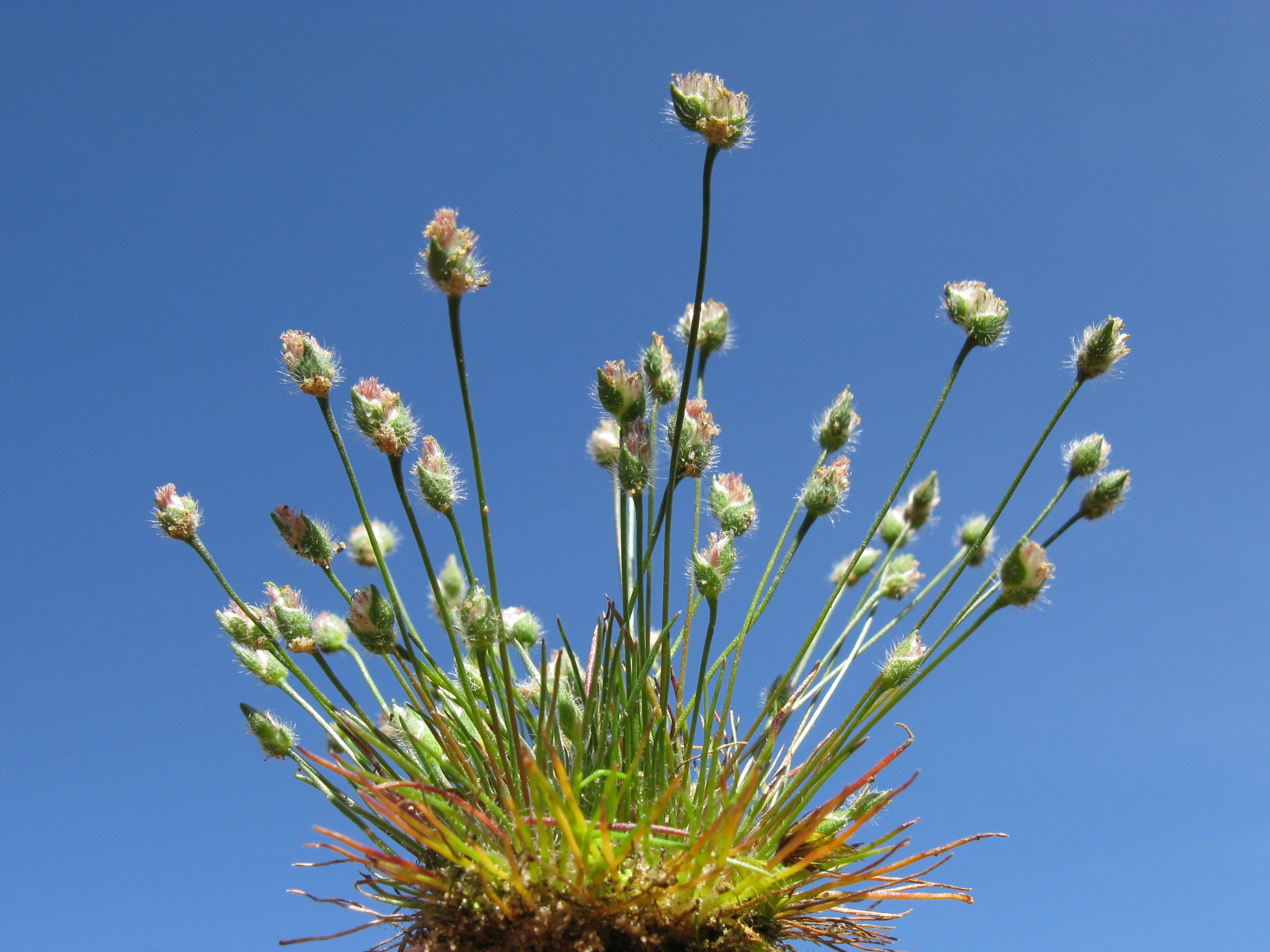

Scientific classification
- Kingdom: Plantae
- Clade: Tracheophytes
- Clade: Angiosperms
- Clade: Monocots
- Clade: Commelinids
- Order: Poales
- Family: Restionaceae
- Genus: Centrolepis
- Species: C. strigosa

Binomial name
- Centrolepis strigosa (R.Br.) Roem. & Schult.

Synonyms
- Desvauxia strigosa

= Centrolepis strigosa =

Hairy centrolepis

Species of flowering plant in the Restionaceae family

Centrolepis strigosa, commonly known as hairy centrolepis, is a species of plant of the Restionaceae family. It is found in New Zealand (the North and South Islands) and Australia

It is an annual tufted herb of 1.5 to 8 cm high. It has numerous radiating leaves. The leaves are covered in multicellular hispid hairs. Flowering occurs from September to November.
