= Centrolepis inconspicua =

Scientific classification
- Kingdom: Plantae
- Clade: Tracheophytes
- Clade: Angiosperms
- Clade: Monocots
- Clade: Commelinids
- Order: Poales
- Family: Restionaceae
- Genus: Centrolepis
- Species: C. inconspicua

Binomial name
- Centrolepis inconspicua W.Fitzg.

Species of grass

Centrolepis inconspicua is a species of plant in the Restionaceae family and is found in Western Australia.

The minute annual herb has a tufted habit and typically grows to a height of approximately 0.5 to 2 centimetres (0.20 to 0.79 in). It blooms between August and October.

It is found in beds of moss, in swamps, on the margins of salt lakes and along the margins of watercourses along the west coast in the Wheatbelt, Mid West and Peel regions of Western Australia.
