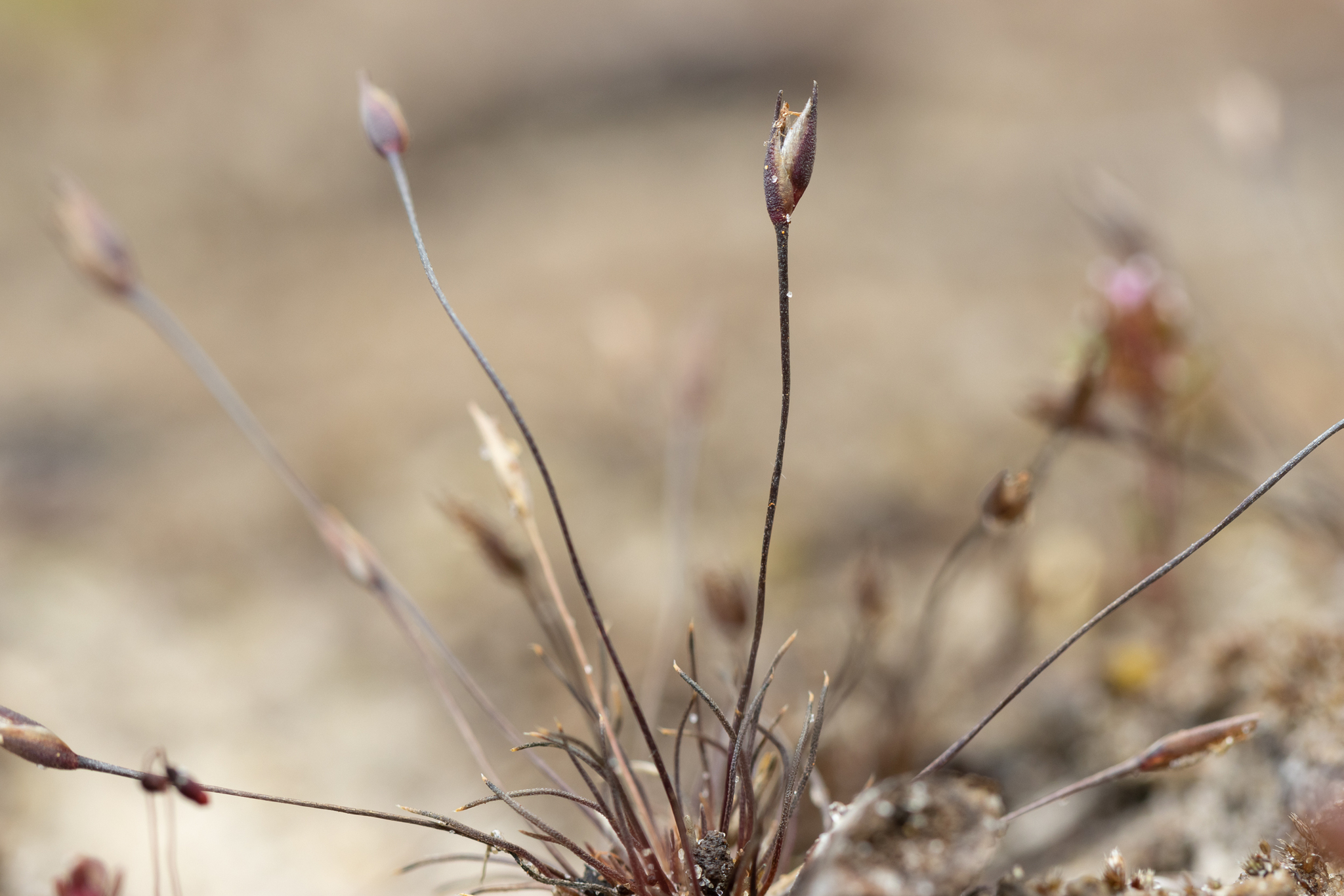

Scientific classification
- Kingdom: Plantae
- Clade: Tracheophytes
- Clade: Angiosperms
- Clade: Monocots
- Clade: Commelinids
- Order: Poales
- Family: Restionaceae
- Genus: Centrolepis
- Species: C. glabra

Binomial name
- Centrolepis glabra (F.Muell.) Hieron.

= Centrolepis glabra =

Smooth centrolepis

Species of grass

Centrolepis glabra, commonly known as smooth centrolepis, is a species of plant in the Restionaceae family.

The annual herb has a tufted habit and typically grows to a height of 10 to 90 centimetres (3.9 to 35.4 in). It blooms between September and November.

In Western Australia it is found among granite outcrops, in winter wet depressions and around swamps in the Peel, Wheatbelt, South West and Great Southern regions where it grows in sandy clay soils.
