= Centrolepis caespitosa =

Conservation status
- Priority Four — Rare Taxa (DEC)

Scientific classification
- Kingdom: Plantae
- Clade: Tracheophytes
- Clade: Angiosperms
- Clade: Monocots
- Clade: Commelinids
- Order: Poales
- Family: Restionaceae
- Genus: Centrolepis
- Species: C. caespitosa

Binomial name
- Centrolepis caespitosa D.A.Cooke

Species of grass

Centrolepis caespitosa is a species of plant in the Restionaceae family and is found in Western Australia.

The annual herb has a tufted habit and typically forms a rounded cushion approximately 2.5 centimetres (0.98 in) in width. It blooms between October and December.

It is found on salt flats and in wet areas in the South West and Great Southern regions of Western Australia where it grows in sandy-clay soils.
