= Centrolepis curta =

Scientific classification
- Kingdom: Plantae
- Clade: Tracheophytes
- Clade: Angiosperms
- Clade: Monocots
- Clade: Commelinids
- Order: Poales
- Family: Restionaceae
- Genus: Centrolepis
- Species: C. curta

Binomial name
- Centrolepis curta D.A.Cooke

Species of grass

Centrolepis curta is a species of plant in the Restionaceae family and is found in Western Australia.

The dwarf, annual herb forms rounded tufts approximately 20 to 40 millimetres (0.79 to 1.57 in) in width. It blooms between May and August.

It is found on alluvial flats and damp areas of seepage in the Kimberley region of Western Australia where it grows in damp sandy-loam soils.
