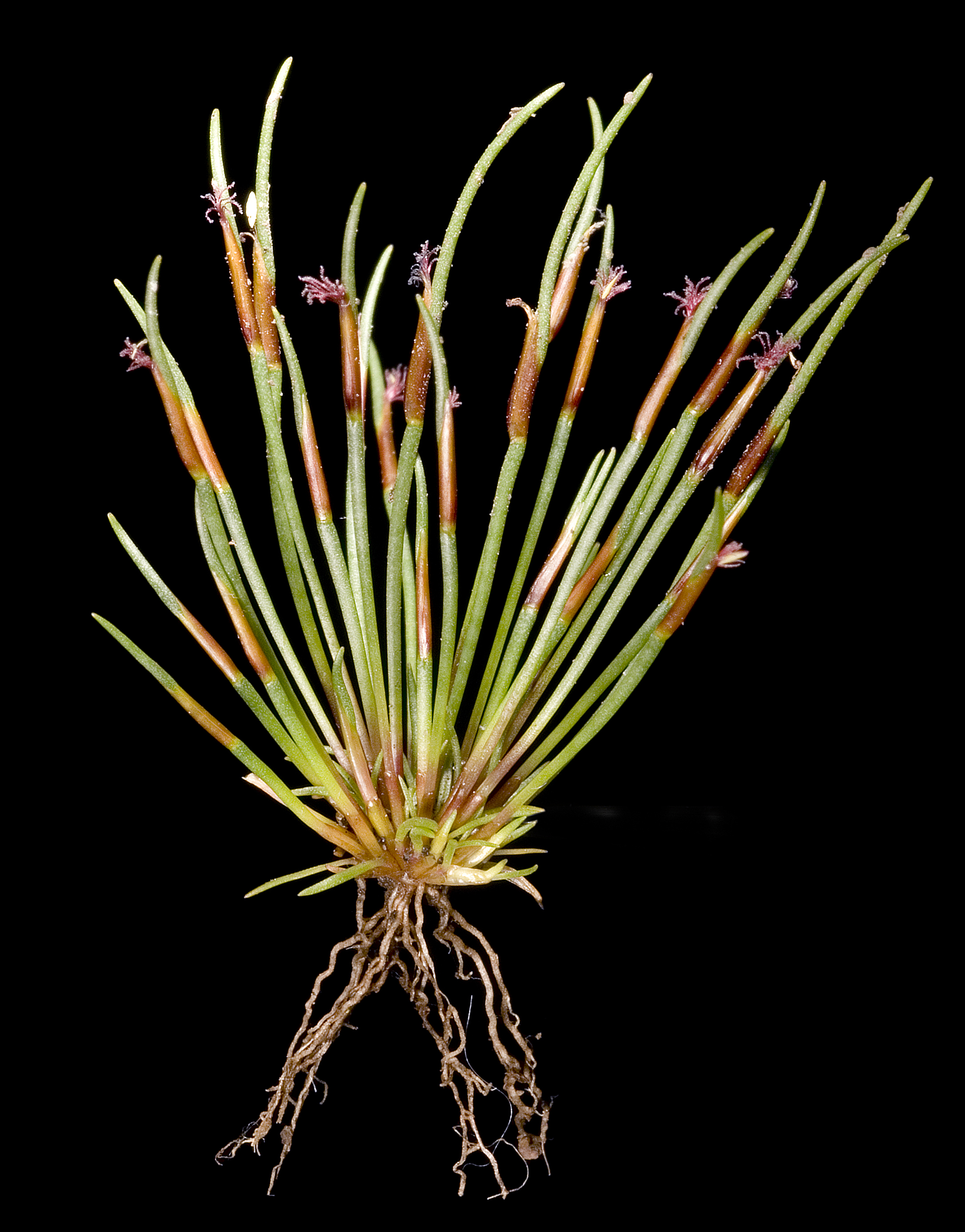

Scientific classification
- Kingdom: Plantae
- Clade: Tracheophytes
- Clade: Angiosperms
- Clade: Monocots
- Clade: Commelinids
- Order: Poales
- Family: Restionaceae
- Genus: Centrolepis
- Species: C. polygyna

Binomial name
- Centrolepis polygyna (R.Br.) Hieron.

= Centrolepis polygyna =

Wiry centrolepis

Species of grass

Centrolepis polygyna, commonly known as wiry centrolepis, is a species of plant in the Restionaceae family and is found in Western Australia.

The reddish annual herb has a tufted habit and typically grows to a height of approximately 1 to 7 centimetres (0.39 to 2.76 in). It blooms between July and December.

It is found in winter wet depressions and seepage areas in the Wheatbelt, Mid West, Peel, South West, Great Southern and Goldfields-Esperance regions of Western Australia where it grows in sandy-clay soils over laterite.
