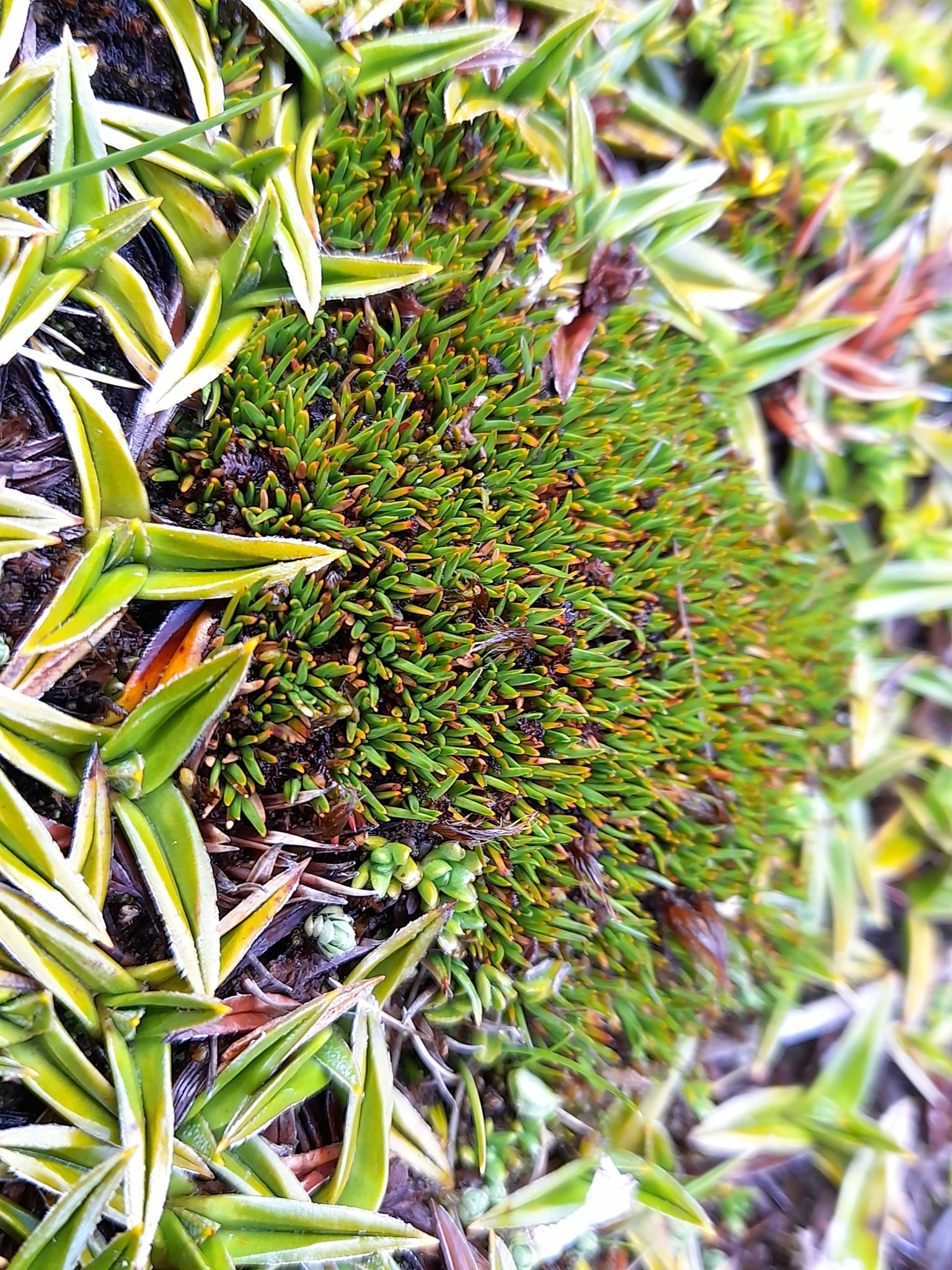
- Gaimardia australis (center)

Scientific classification
- Kingdom: Plantae
- Clade: Tracheophytes
- Clade: Angiosperms
- Clade: Monocots
- Clade: Commelinids
- Order: Poales
- Family: Restionaceae
- Genus: Gaimardia; Gaudich.

= Gaimardia =

Genus of flowering plants

Gaimardia is a genus of plants in the Restionaceae family. It has a disjunct distribution in New Zealand, New Guinea, Tasmania and extreme southern South America.

The APG III system classifies this genus in the Centrolepidaceae family.

== Species ==
Four species are recognised:

- Gaimardia amblyphylla W.M.Curtis – Tasmania
- Gaimardia australis Gaudich. – Falkland Islands, Magellan Strait region in Chile + Argentina
- Gaimardia fitzgeraldii F.Muell. & Rodw. – Tasmania
- Gaimardia setacea Hook.f. –- New Guinea, Tasmania, New Zealand South Island
