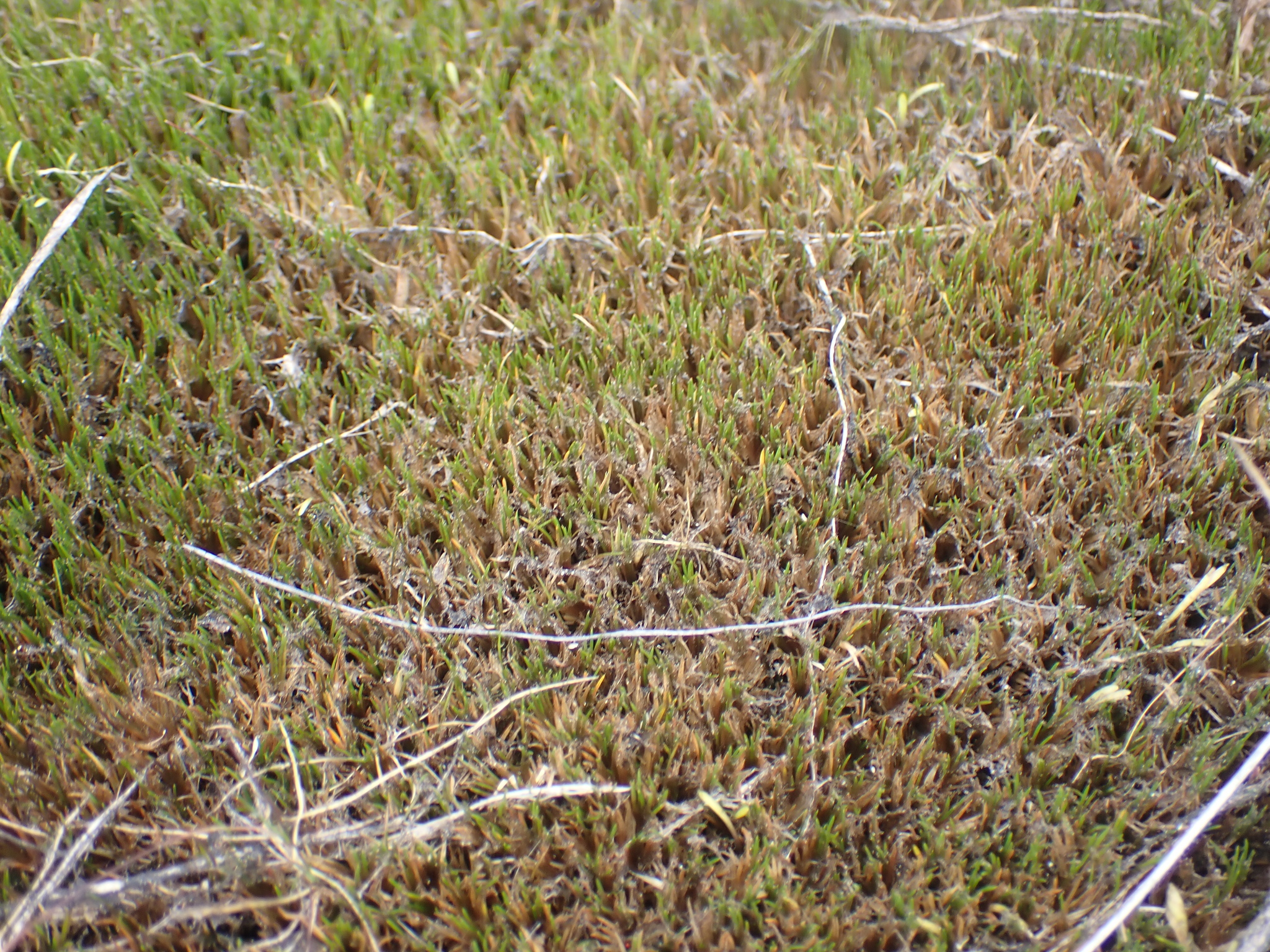

Scientific classification
- Kingdom: Plantae
- Clade: Tracheophytes
- Clade: Angiosperms
- Clade: Monocots
- Clade: Commelinids
- Order: Poales
- Family: Restionaceae
- Genus: Gaimardia
- Species: G. setacea

Binomial name
- Gaimardia setacea Hook.f.

= Gaimardia setacea =

Species of flowering plant

Gaimardia setacea is a species of plant of the Restionaceae family. It is found in New Zealand (on the South Island and the Stewart Islands), New Guinea and Tasmania.
