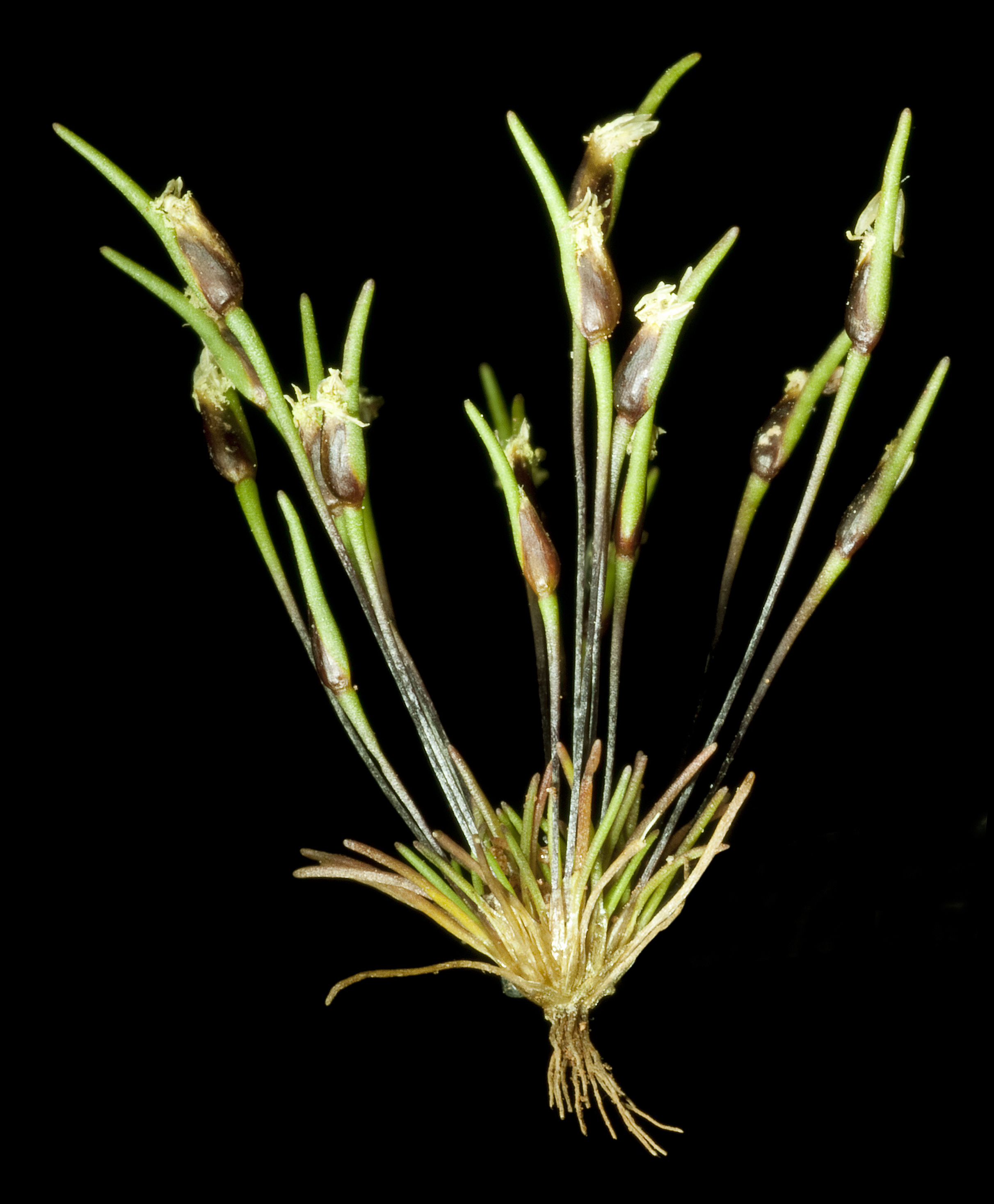

Scientific classification
- Kingdom: Plantae
- Clade: Tracheophytes
- Clade: Angiosperms
- Clade: Monocots
- Clade: Commelinids
- Order: Poales
- Family: Restionaceae
- Genus: Centrolepis
- Species: C. eremica

Binomial name
- Centrolepis eremica D.A.Cooke

= Centrolepis eremica =

Species of grass

Centrolepis eremica is a species of plant in the Restionaceae family and is found in Western Australia.

The annual herb has a tufted habit and typically forms a hemispherical mound approximately 6 centimetres (2.36 in) in width. It blooms between July and September.

It is found amongst boulders and the margins of watercourses in the Wheatbelt, Mid West and Goldfields-Esperance regions of Western Australia where it grows in sandy-clay-loam granitic soils.
