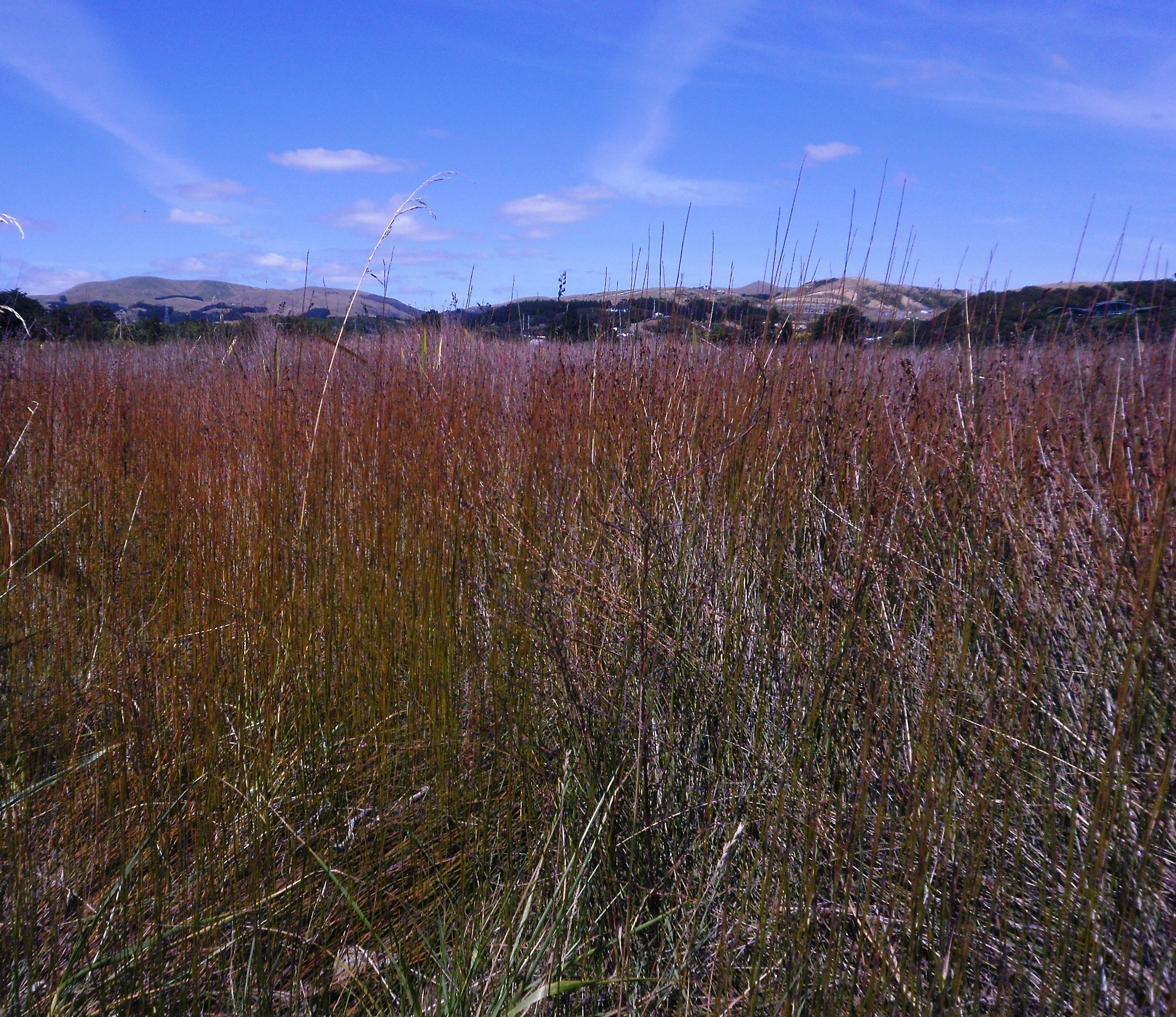

Scientific classification
- Kingdom: Plantae
- Clade: Tracheophytes
- Clade: Angiosperms
- Clade: Monocots
- Clade: Commelinids
- Order: Poales
- Family: Restionaceae
- Genus: Apodasmia
- Species: A. similis

Binomial name
- Apodasmia similis B.G.Briggs & L.A.S.Johnson

Synonyms
- Leptocarpus similis Edgar

= Apodasmia similis =

Species of flowering plant

Apodasmia similis, also known as oioi or jointed wire rush, is a plant that is endemic to New Zealand. It is a coastal plant but is also found around peat bogs and hot springs. It flowers from October to December and bears fruit from December to March. The flower colour for this species is described as brown and red/pink.

== Importance ==
Apodasmia similis, along with Empodisma minus, are the respective host plants of the two species of leafhoppers, Paracephaleus hudsoni and Paracephaleus curtus, native to New Zealand.

== See also ==
- Wetlands of New Zealand
