= Centrolepis milleri =

Conservation status
- Priority Three — Poorly Known Taxa (DEC)

Scientific classification
- Kingdom: Plantae
- Clade: Tracheophytes
- Clade: Angiosperms
- Clade: Monocots
- Clade: Commelinids
- Order: Poales
- Family: Restionaceae
- Genus: Centrolepis
- Species: C. milleri

Binomial name
- Centrolepis milleri M.D.Barrett & D.D.Sokoloff

Species of grass

Centrolepis milleri is a species of plant in the Restionaceae family and is found in Western Australia.

The annual herb is found in two small areas in Wheatbelt near Dandaragan and in the Great Southern near Albany.
