= Centrolepis banksii =

Scientific classification
- Kingdom: Plantae
- Clade: Tracheophytes
- Clade: Angiosperms
- Clade: Monocots
- Clade: Commelinids
- Order: Poales
- Family: Restionaceae
- Genus: Centrolepis
- Species: C. banksii

Binomial name
- Centrolepis banksii (R.Br.) Roem. & Schult.

Species of grass

Centrolepis banksii is a species of plant in the Restionaceae family and is found in northern parts of Australia.

The sometimes red coloured annual herb has a tufted habit and typically grows to a height of 2 to 12 centimetres (0.8 to 4.7 in). It blooms between May and August.

The species was first formally described by botanist Jean Louis Marie Poiret in 1817 as part of the work Encyclopédie Méthodique, Botanique Suppl.. The only synonyms are Devauxia pusilla and Devauxia banksii.

It is found in and around swamps and along creeks and streams in the Kimberley and Pilbara regions of Western Australia where it grows in damp muddy-sandy soils. It is also found in the Northern Territory and Queensland.
