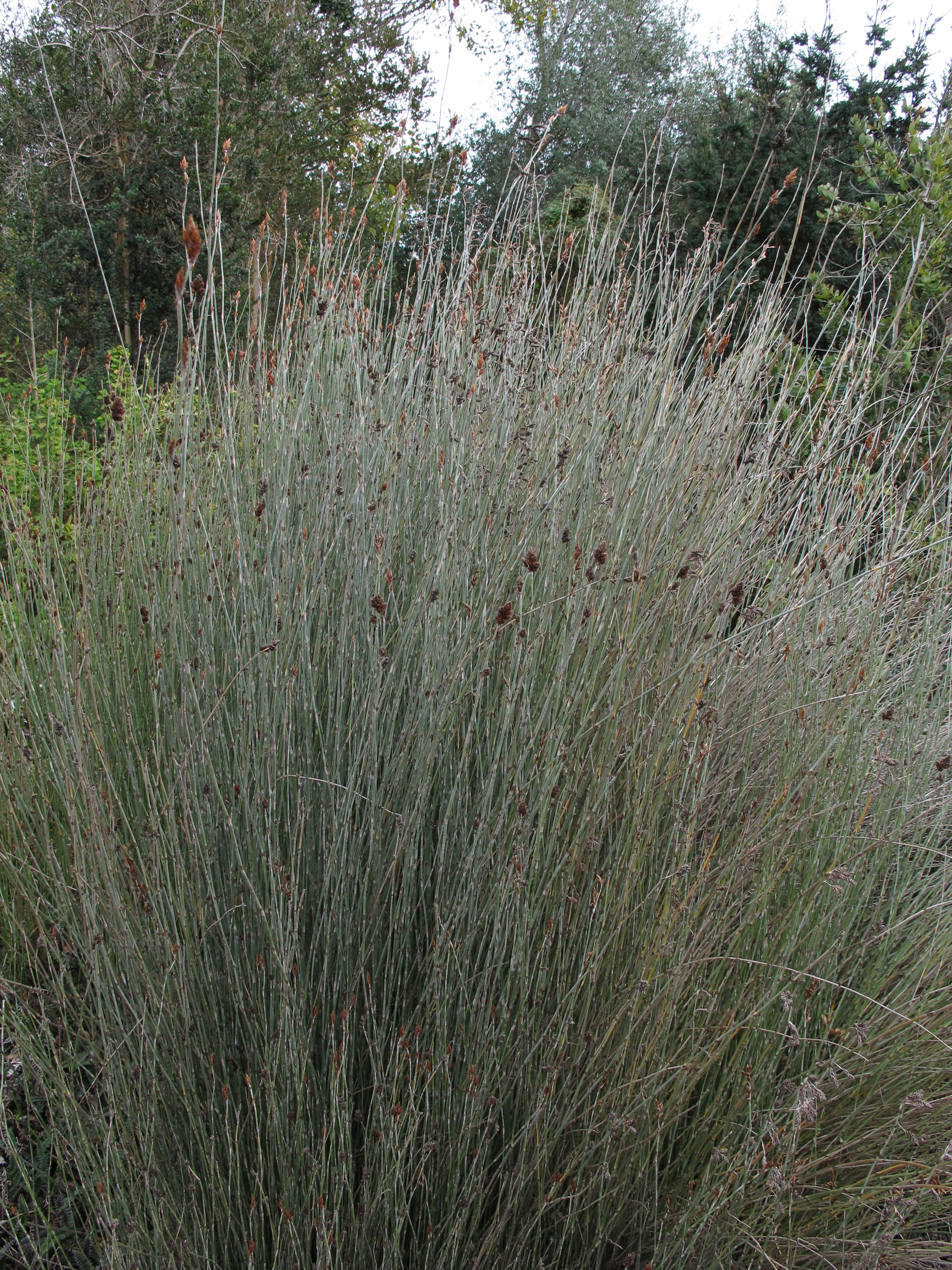
- Apodasmia chilensis

Scientific classification
- Kingdom: Plantae
- Clade: Tracheophytes
- Clade: Angiosperms
- Clade: Monocots
- Clade: Commelinids
- Order: Poales
- Family: Restionaceae
- Genus: Apodasmia; B.G.Briggs & L.A.S.Johnson (1998)

Type species
- Apodasmia brownii (Hook.f.) B.G.Briggs & L.A.S.Johnson

= Apodasmia (plant) =

Genus of flowering plants

Apodasmia is a group of plants in the Restionaceae described as a genus in 1998. It is native to Australia, New Zealand, and Chile.

Species

- Apodasmia brownii (Hook.f.) B.G.Briggs & L.A.S.Johnson - SA, Tas, Vic
- Apodasmia chilensis (Gay) B.G.Briggs & L.A.S.Johnson - southern Chile
- Apodasmia similis (Edgar) B.G.Briggs & L.A.S.Johnson - New Zealand (North + South + Chatham Is)
