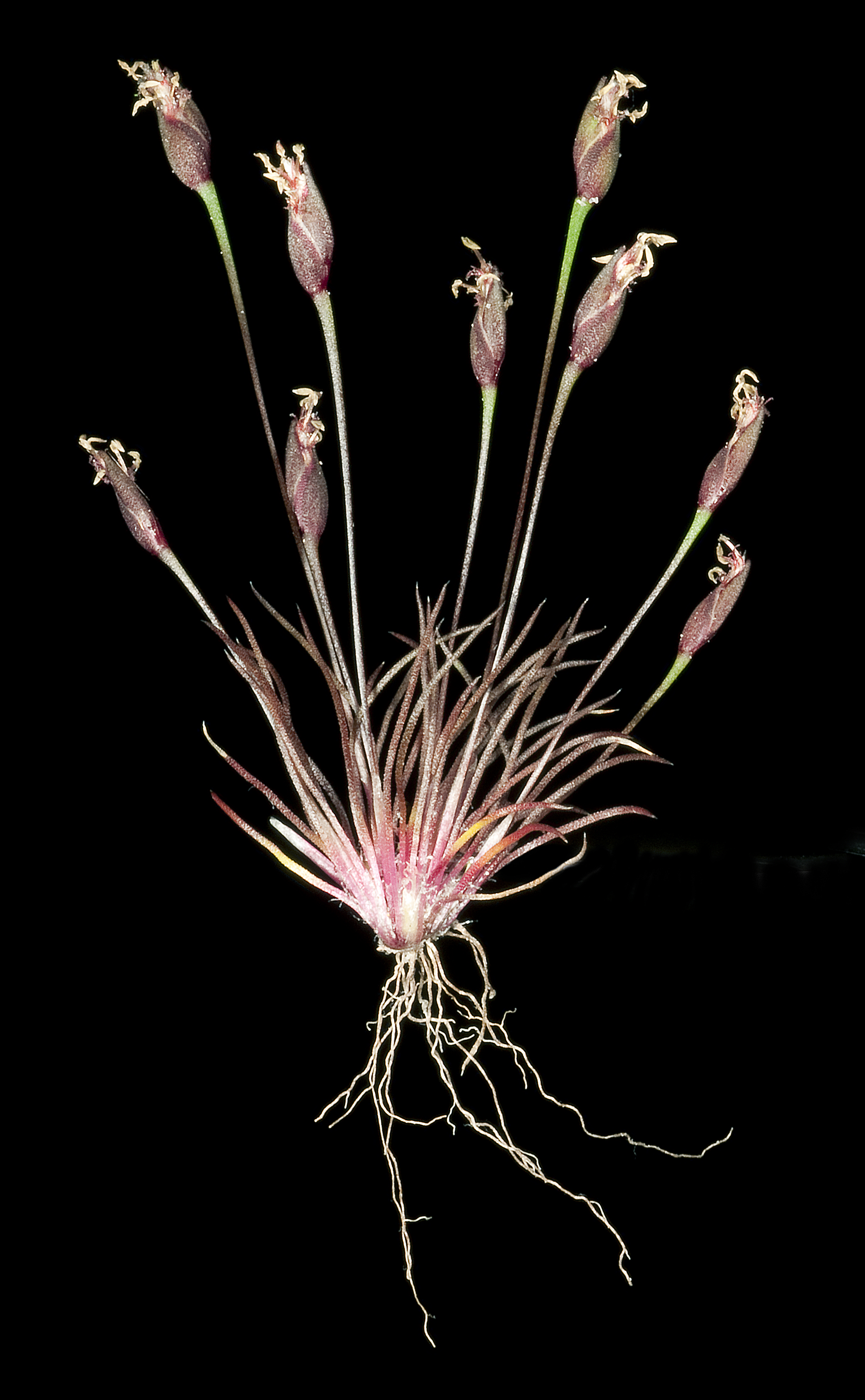

Scientific classification
- Kingdom: Plantae
- Clade: Tracheophytes
- Clade: Angiosperms
- Clade: Monocots
- Clade: Commelinids
- Order: Poales
- Family: Restionaceae
- Genus: Centrolepis
- Species: C. drummondiana

Binomial name
- Centrolepis drummondiana (Nees) Walp.

= Centrolepis drummondiana =

Species of grass

Centrolepis drummondiana is a species of plant in the Restionaceae family and is found in Western Australia.

The annual herb has a tufted habit and typically grows to a height of 12 centimetres (4.72 in). It blooms between September and November.

It is found among granite outcrops, growing amongst mosses and in wet areas in the Mid West, Wheatbelt, South West, Great Southern and Goldfields-Esperance regions of Western Australia where it grows in sandy-clay soils.
