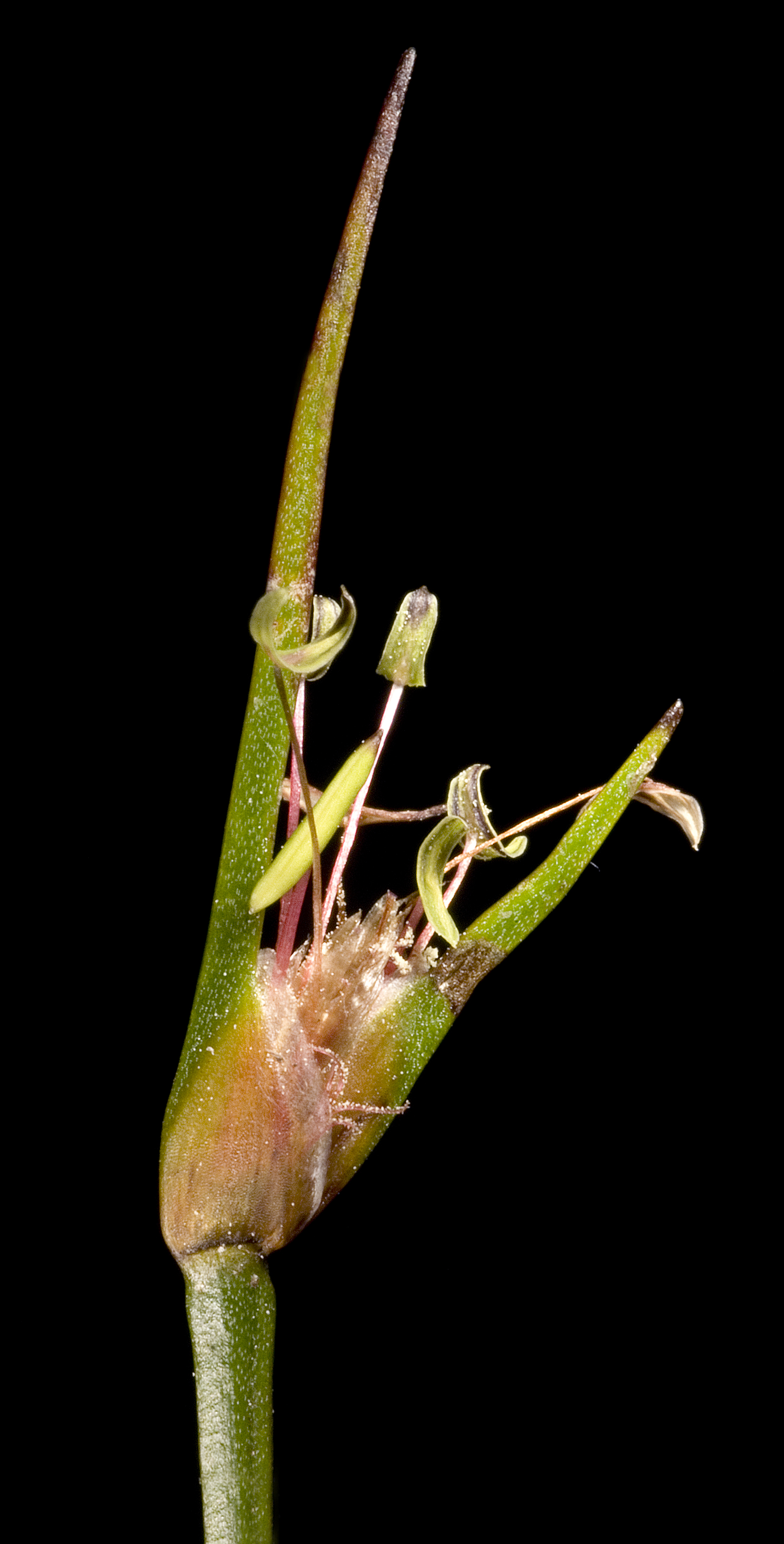
- Centrolepis aristata flower

Scientific classification
- Kingdom: Plantae
- Clade: Tracheophytes
- Clade: Angiosperms
- Clade: Monocots
- Clade: Commelinids
- Order: Poales
- Family: Restionaceae
- Genus: Centrolepis
- Species: C. aristata

Binomial name
- Centrolepis aristata (R.Br.) Roem. & Schult.

= Centrolepis aristata =

Pointed centrolepis

Species of plant

Centrolepis aristata, commonly known as pointed centrolepis, is a species of plant in the Restionaceae family and is found in areas of southern Australia.

== Description ==
The annual herb has a tufted habit and typically grows to a height of 2 to 20 centimetres (0.8 to 7.9 in). It is a bright green colour becoming reddish after it flowers. The shiny, glabrous, thin, pointed leaves are typically 6 centimetres (2.4 in) in length with a width of 1.6 millimetres (0.06 in). It flowers between August and December. The flower heads have a flattened oblong-ovoid shape and are around 3 mm (0.12 in) wide. the flowers have a brown base and two long opposite primary bracts. Between 6-22 flowers form in a terminal cluster, the flowers have a brown to yellowish colour. Brown ovoid fruit follow that contain small soft seeds. The seeds are fusiform and 0.6 to 0.8 mm (0.024 to 0.031 in) long.

== Classification ==
The species was first formally described by the botanist Robert Brown and then by Johann Jacob Roemer and Josef August Schultes in 1817 in the work Systema Vegetabilium.

== Distribution ==
It is found among rocky outcrops and in winter wet depressions in the Mid West, Wheatbelt, South West, Great Southern and Goldfields-Esperance regions of Western Australia where it grows in damp sandy-clay-loam soils over granite. In South Australia it is found along much of the south coast, all of the Eyre Peninsula and Yorke Peninsula, through all of the southeast and as far north as the Flinders Ranges. The plant is also found in New South Wales, Victoria, and Tasmania.
