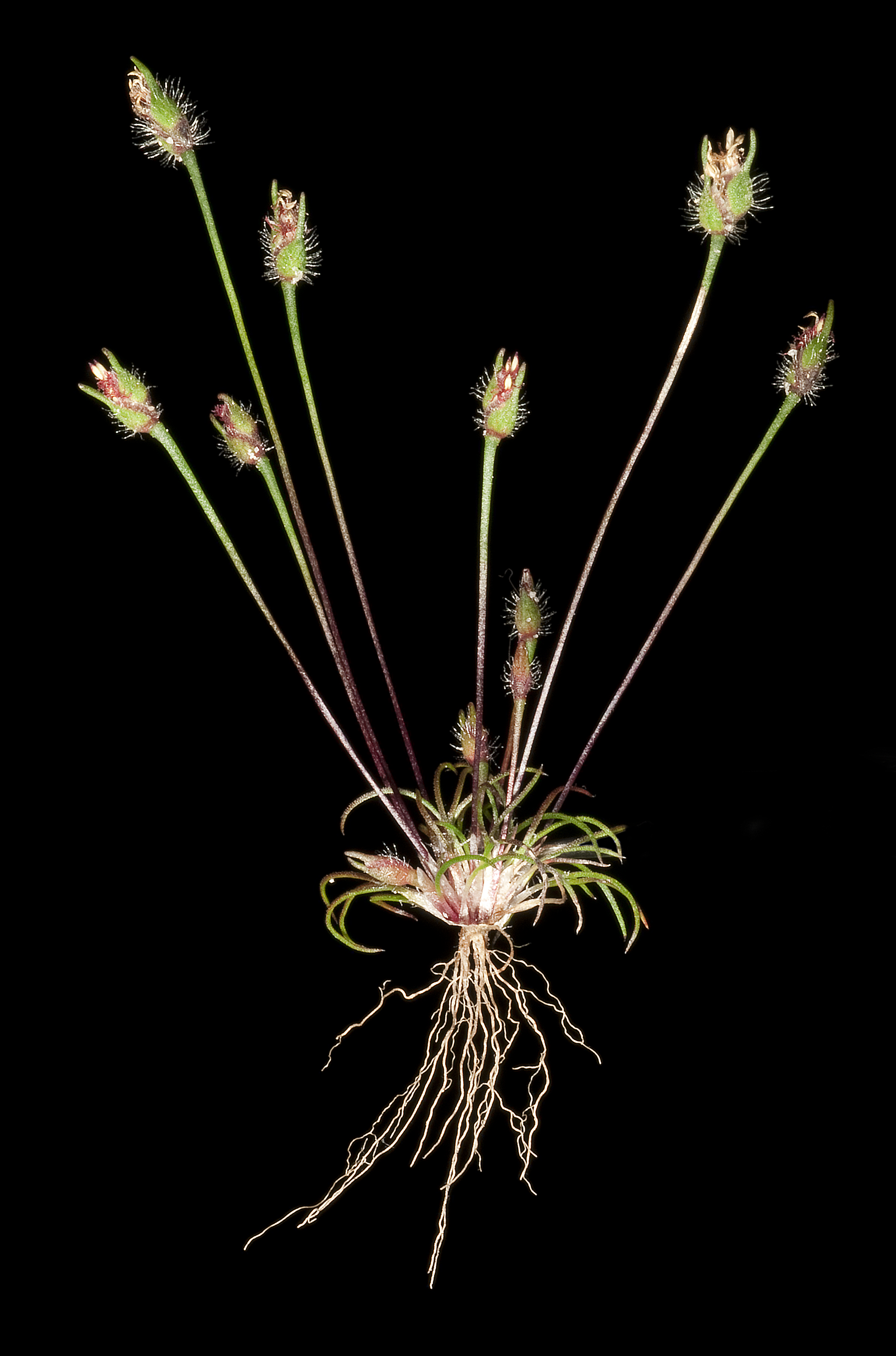

Scientific classification
- Kingdom: Plantae
- Clade: Tracheophytes
- Clade: Angiosperms
- Clade: Monocots
- Clade: Commelinids
- Order: Poales
- Family: Restionaceae
- Genus: Centrolepis
- Species: C. pilosa

Binomial name
- Centrolepis pilosa Hieron.

= Centrolepis pilosa =

Species of plant

Centrolepis pilosa is a species of plant in the Restionaceae family and is found in Western Australia.

The reddish annual herb has a tufted habit and typically grows to a height of approximately 2.5 to 90 centimetres (0.98 to 35.43 in). It blooms between September and October.

It is found in beds of moss in the Wheatbelt, Mid West, Peel, South West and Great Southern regions of Western Australia where it grows in sandy soils over laterite.
