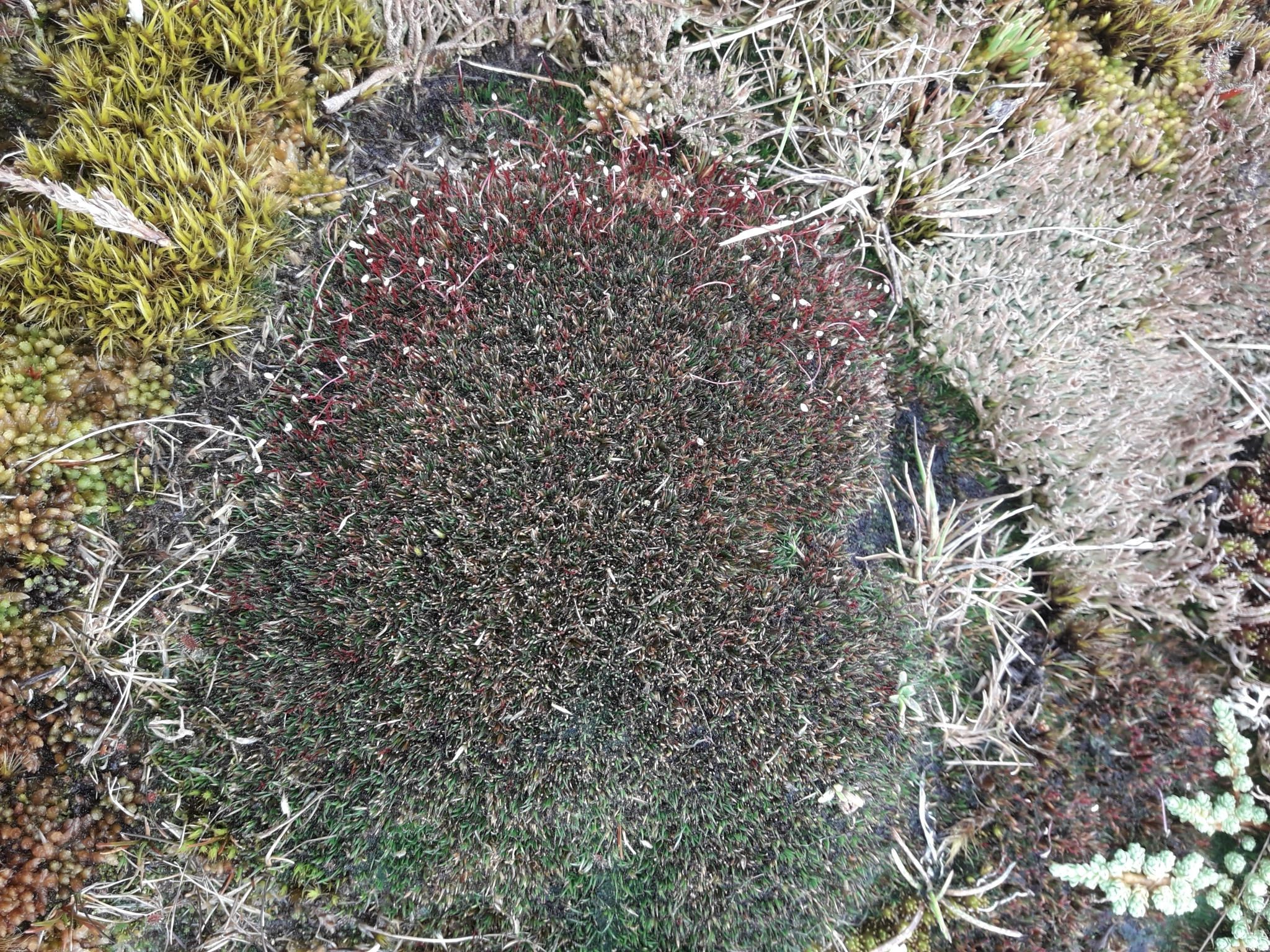

Scientific classification
- Kingdom: Plantae
- Clade: Tracheophytes
- Clade: Angiosperms
- Clade: Monocots
- Clade: Commelinids
- Order: Poales
- Family: Restionaceae
- Genus: Centrolepis
- Species: C. pallida

Binomial name
- Centrolepis pallida (Hook.f.) Cheeseman

Synonyms
- Alphabetical list: Alepyrum pallidum (Hook.f.) Hook.f.; Centrolepis minima Kirk; Gaimardia minima (Kirk) Cheeseman; Gaimardia pallida Hook.f.; Pseudalepyrum minimum (Kirk) Dandy; Pseudalepyrum pallidum (Hook.f.) Dandy

= Centrolepis pallida =

Species of flowering plant

Centrolepis pallida is a species of plant of the family Restionaceae. It is found in New Zealand, found both in the North and South Islands, and in the sub-Antarctic: Auckland Islands and Campbell Island).

== Gallery ==
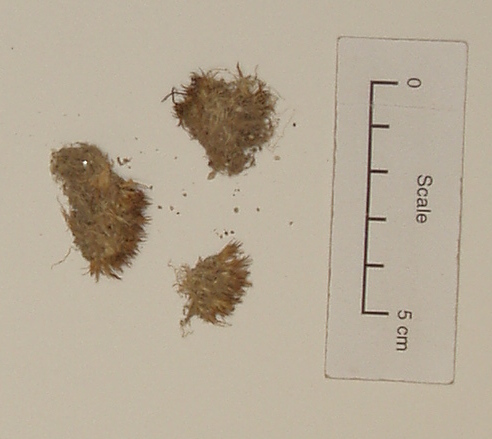
Herbarium specimen from Auckland War Memorial Museum

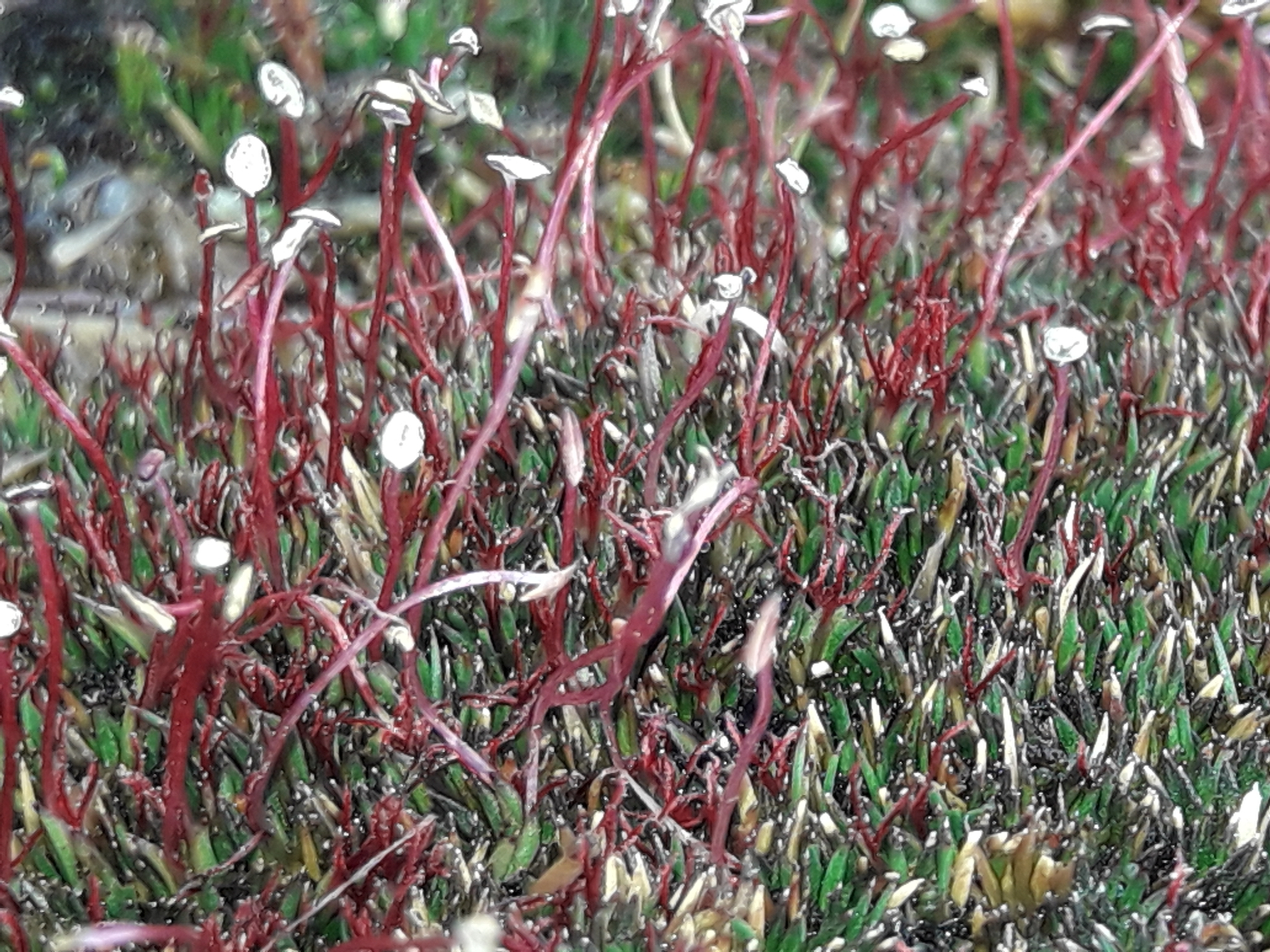
Flowers of C. pallida

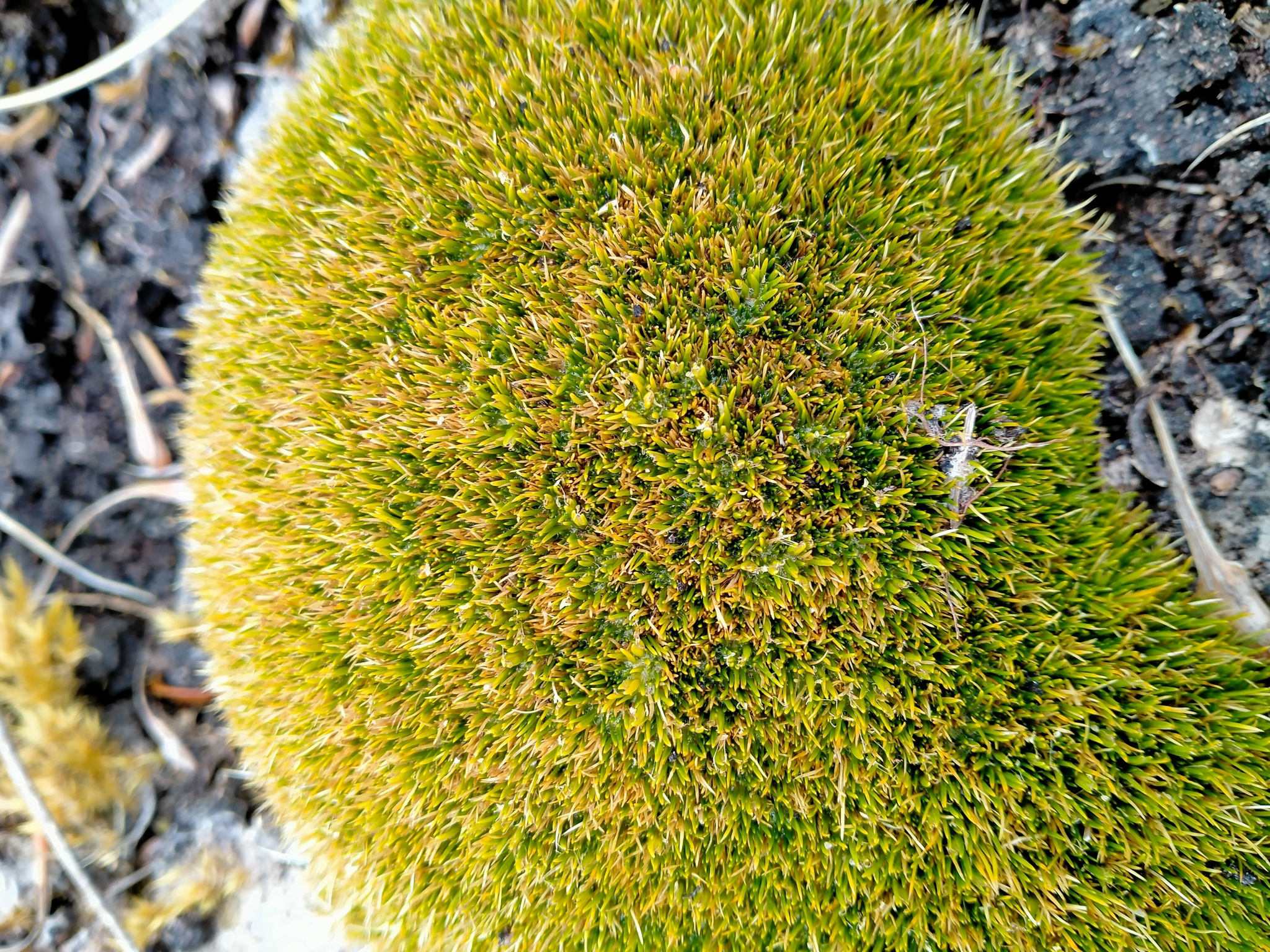

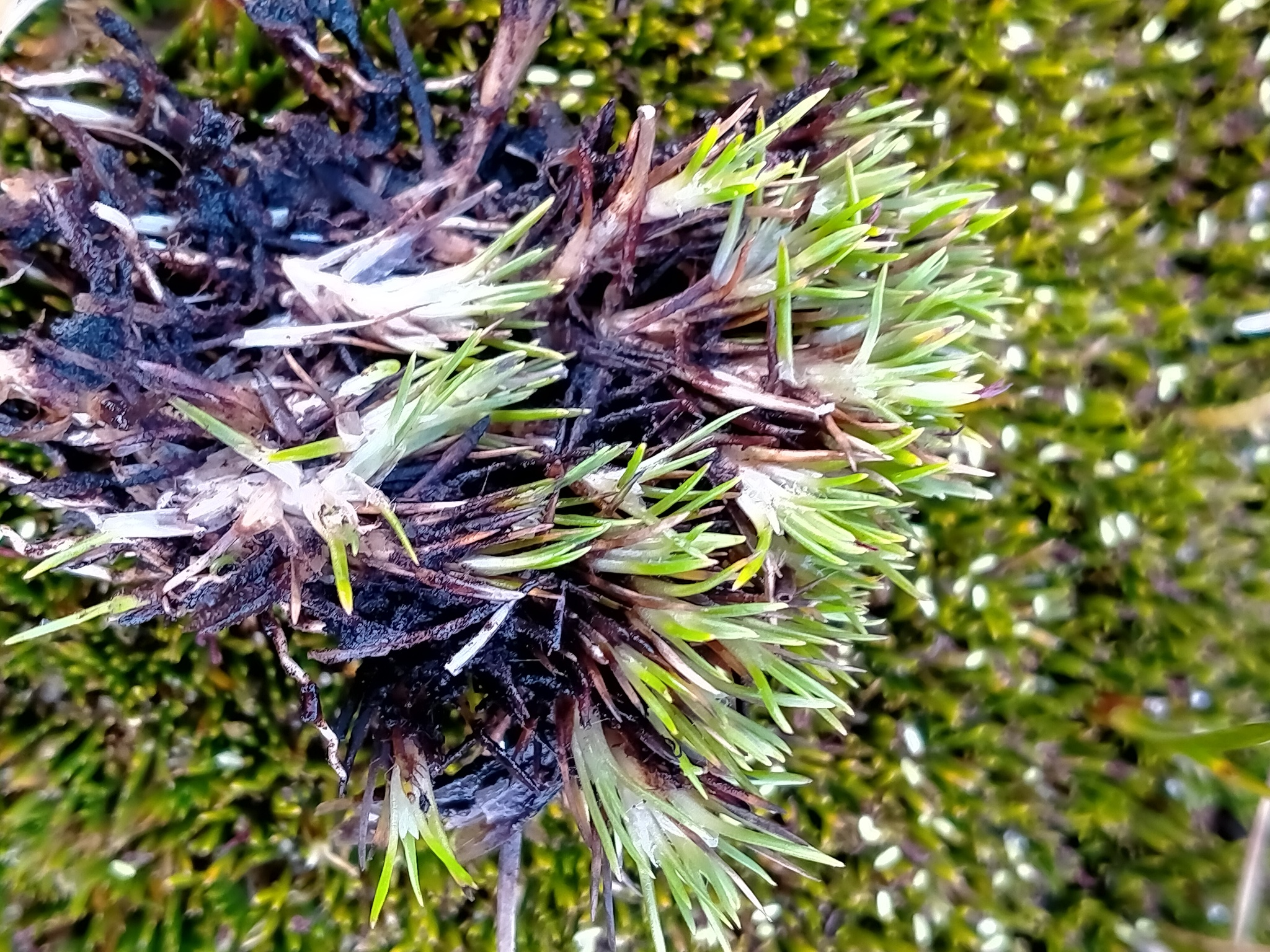

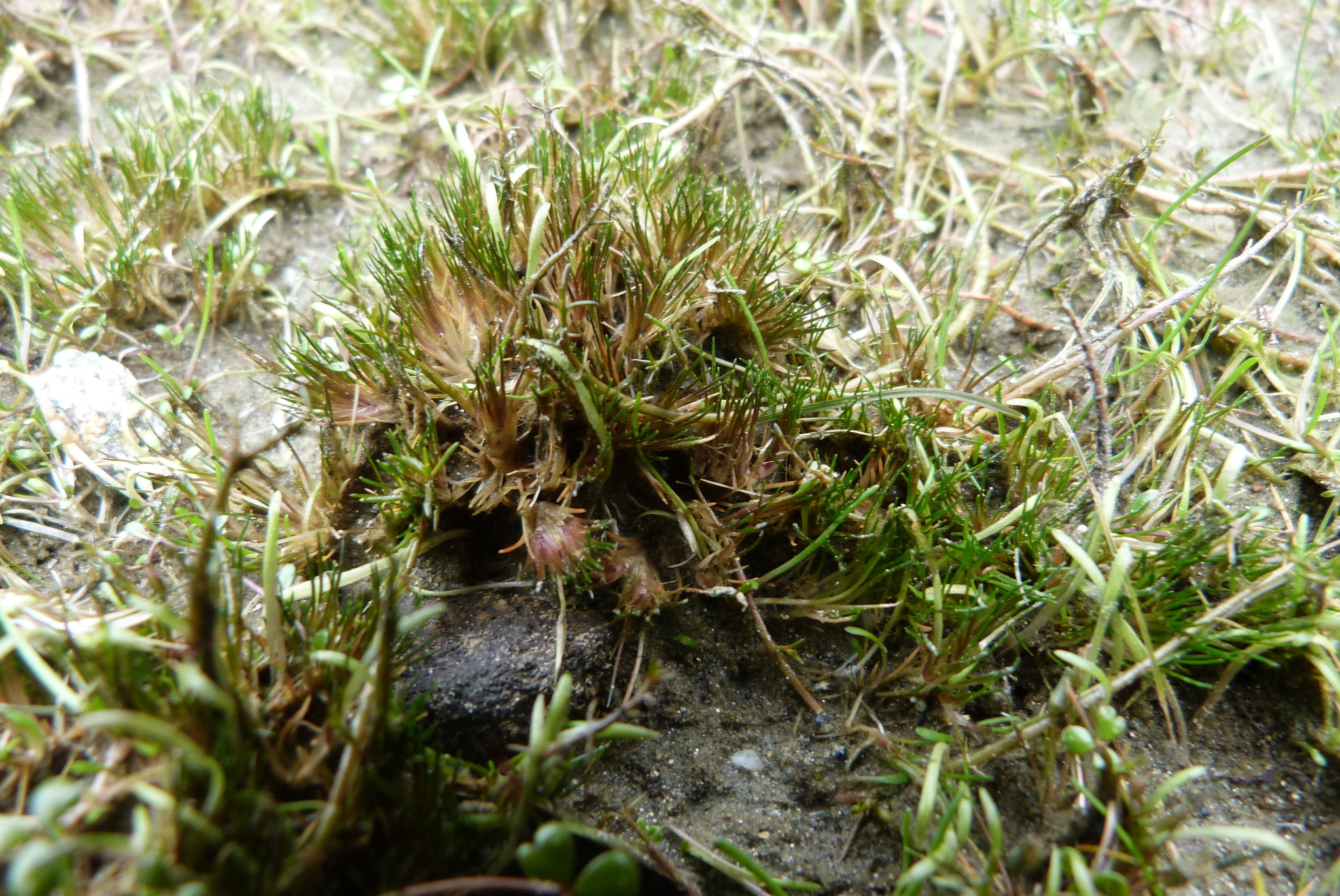
