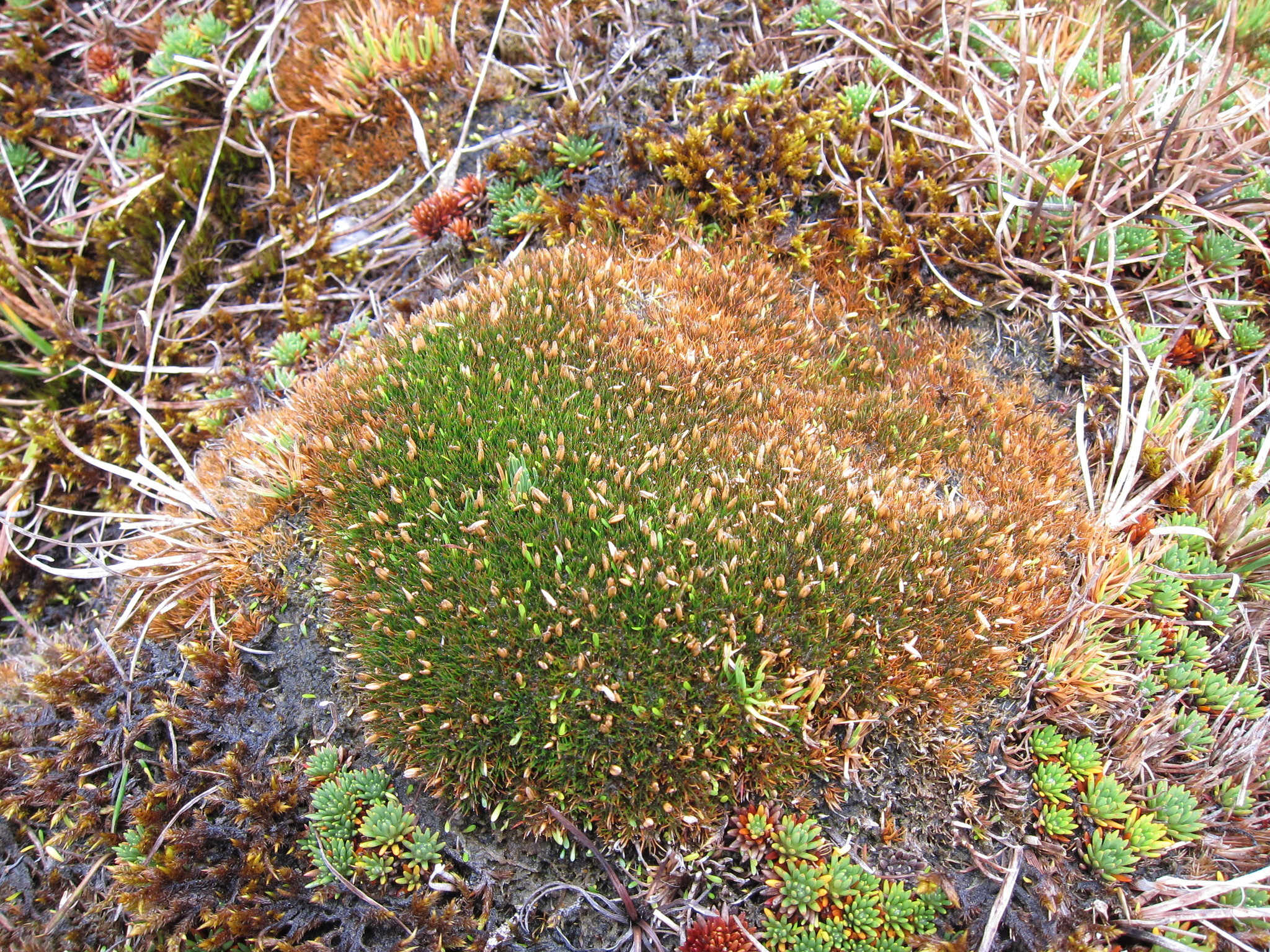
- Centrolepis ciliata

Scientific classification
- Kingdom: Plantae
- Clade: Embryophytes
- Clade: Tracheophytes
- Clade: Spermatophytes
- Clade: Angiosperms
- Clade: Monocots
- Clade: Commelinids
- Order: Poales
- Family: Restionaceae
- Genus: Centrolepis
- Species: C. ciliata

Binomial name
- Centrolepis ciliata (Hook.f.) Druce

Synonyms
- Gaimardia ciliata; Alepyrum ciliatum; Centrolepis viridis Kirk; Centrolepis viridis var. ligulata (Kirk) Cheeseman; Pseudalepyrum ciliatum (Hook.f.) Dandy; Pseudalepyrum ciliatum var. ligulatum (Kirk) Dandy

= Centrolepis ciliata =

Species of flowering plant

Centrolepis ciliata is a species of plant of the Restionaceae family. It is found in New Zealand (North & South Islands, and in the sub-Antarctic: Auckland Islands & Campbell Island).
