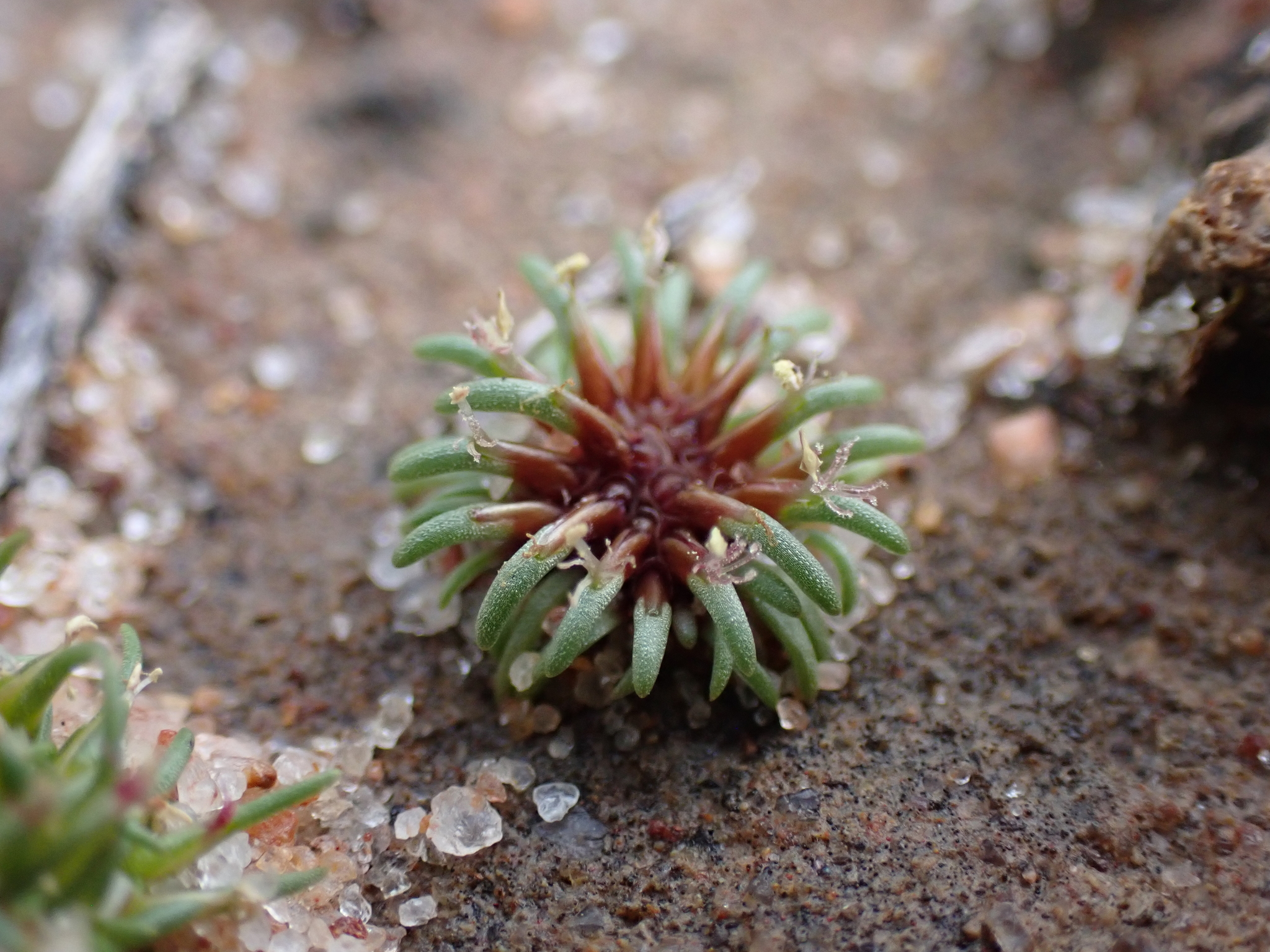

Scientific classification
- Kingdom: Plantae
- Clade: Tracheophytes
- Clade: Angiosperms
- Clade: Monocots
- Clade: Commelinids
- Order: Poales
- Family: Restionaceae
- Genus: Centrolepis
- Species: C. humillima

Binomial name
- Centrolepis humillima Benth.

= Centrolepis humillima =

Dwarf centrolepis

Species of grass

Centrolepis humillima, commonly known as dwarf centrolepis, is a species of plant in the family Restionaceae and is found in Western Australia.

The annual herb has a densely tufted habit and typically grows to a height of 3 to 10 centimetres (1.18 to 3.94 in). It blooms between September and December.

It is found amongst moss beds and along the margins of salt lakes and claypans in the Wheatbelt, Mid West, Great Southern and Goldfields-Esperance regions of Western Australia where it grows in sandy-clay soils.
