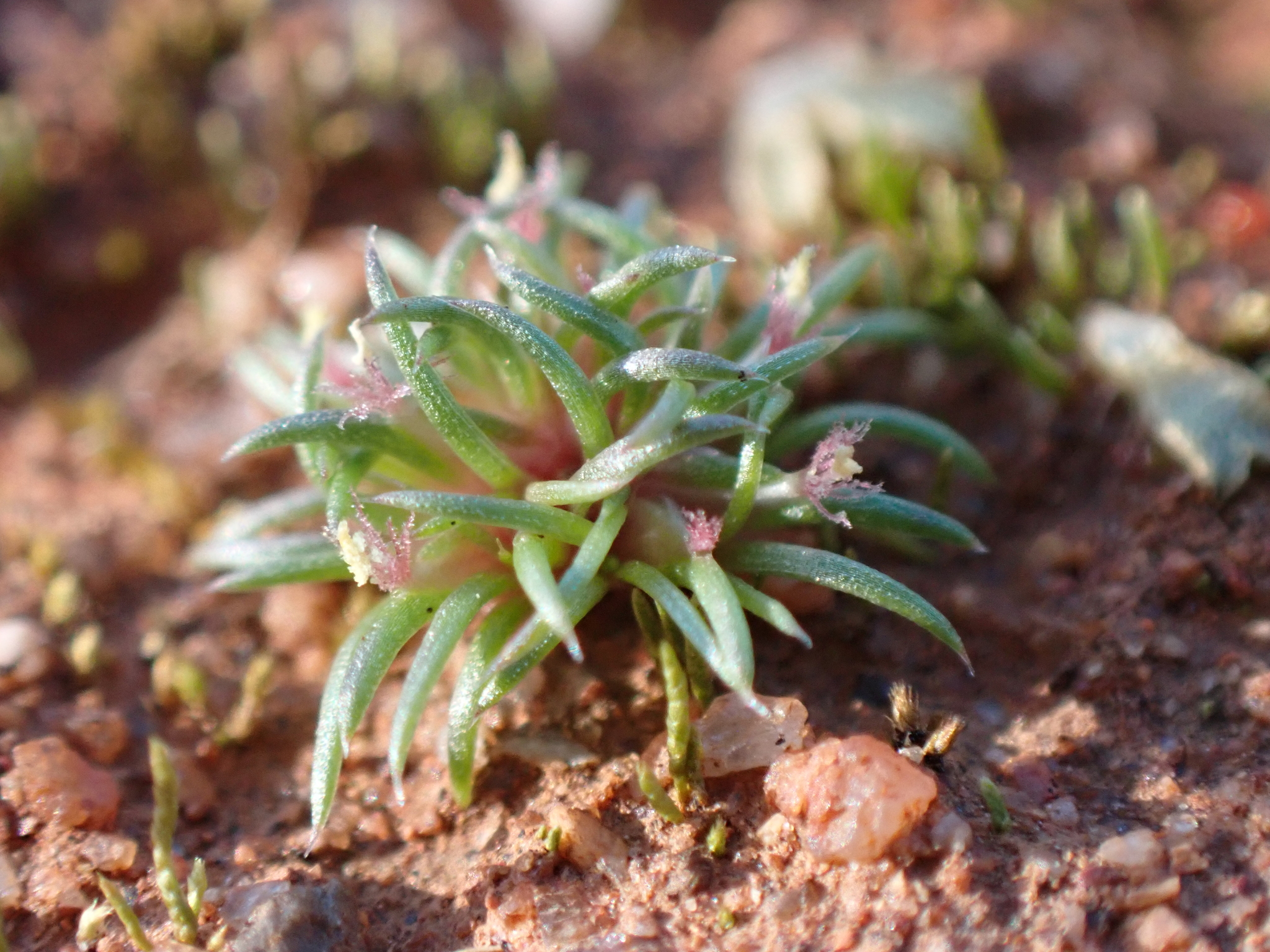

Scientific classification
- Kingdom: Plantae
- Clade: Tracheophytes
- Clade: Angiosperms
- Clade: Monocots
- Clade: Commelinids
- Order: Poales
- Family: Restionaceae
- Genus: Centrolepis
- Species: C. cephaloformis

Binomial name
- Centrolepis cephaloformis Reader

= Centrolepis cephaloformis =

Species of grass

Centrolepis cephaloformis is a species of plant in the Restionaceae family and is found in southern Australia.

== Description ==
The annual herb typically grows to a height of 1 centimetre (0.39 in). It blooms between August and October.

== Distribution and habitat ==
It is found on salt flats and in wet areas among mosses in the Mid West, Wheatbelt and Goldfields-Esperance regions of Western Australia where it grows in sandy-clay soils over granite.

== Taxonomy ==
Two subspecies are recognised:

- Centrolepis cephaloformis subsp. cephaloformis Reader
- Centrolepis cephaloformis subsp. murrayi (J.M.Black) D.A.Cooke
