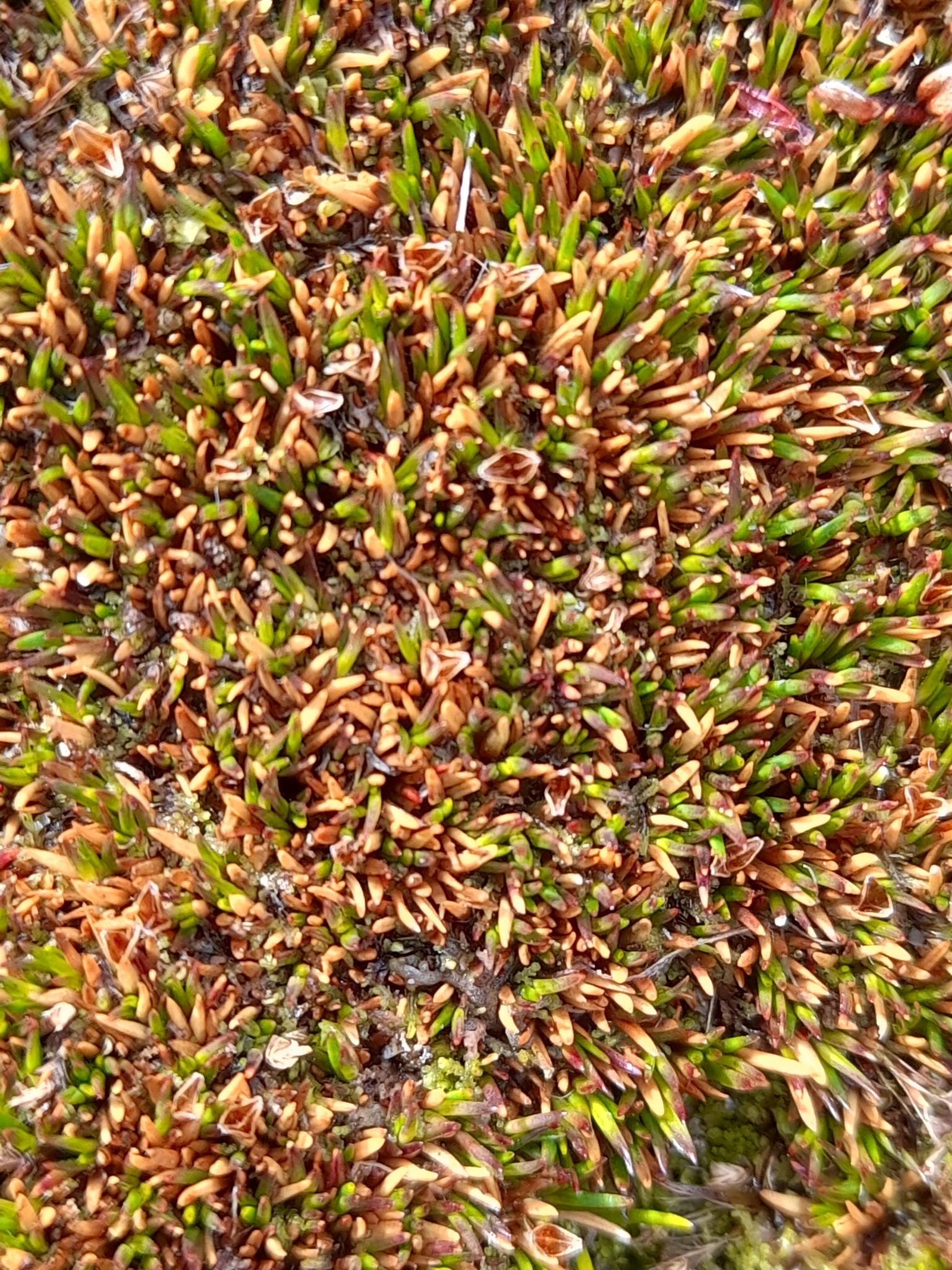

Scientific classification
- Kingdom: Plantae
- Clade: Tracheophytes
- Clade: Angiosperms
- Clade: Monocots
- Clade: Commelinids
- Order: Poales
- Family: Restionaceae
- Genus: Gaimardia
- Species: G. australis

Binomial name
- Gaimardia australis Gaudich.

= Gaimardia australis =

Species of plant

Gaimardia australis is a species of flowering plant in the family Restionaceae. It is native to southern Chile, southern Argentina and the Falkland Islands.
