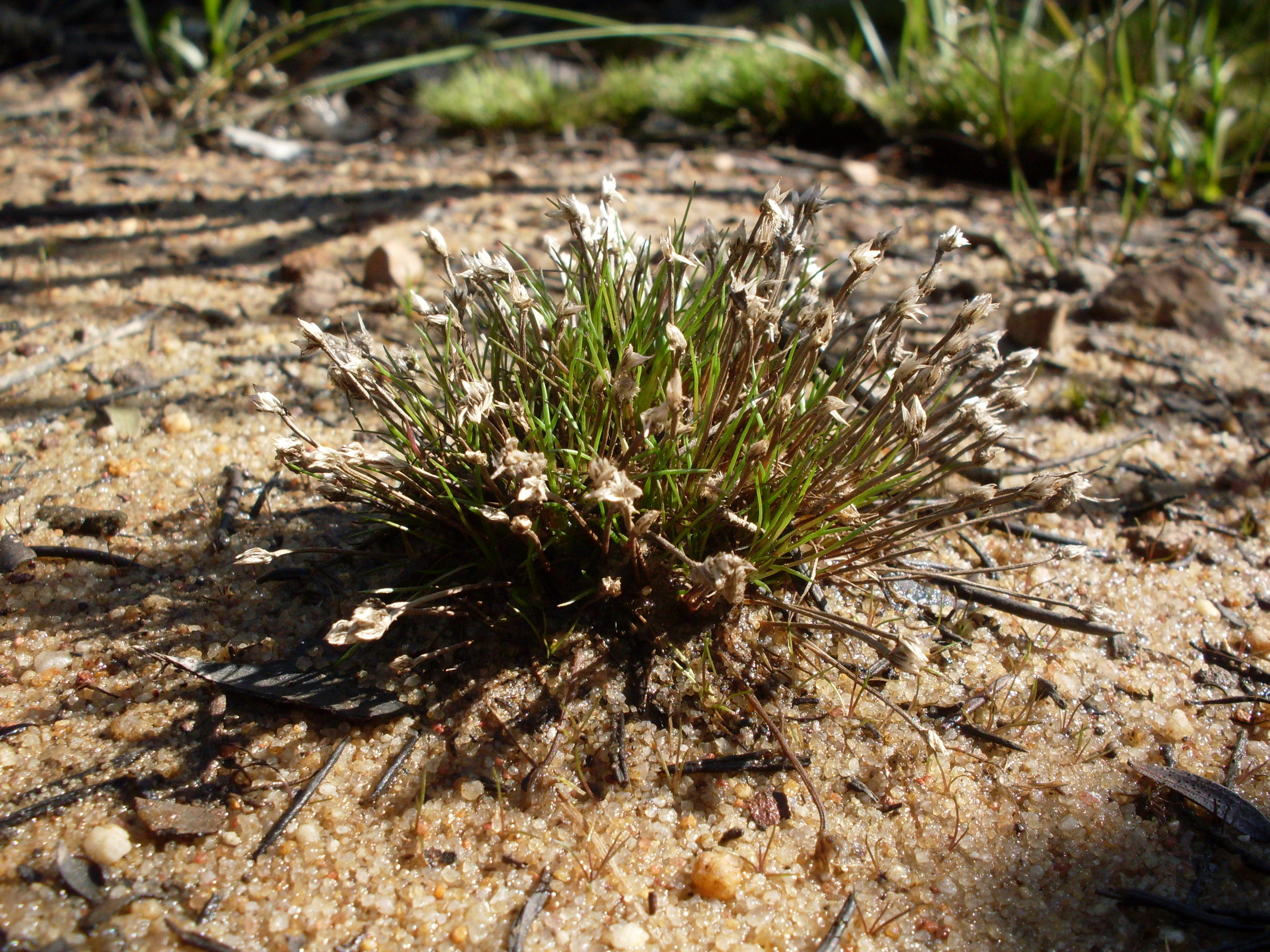

Scientific classification
- Kingdom: Plantae
- Clade: Tracheophytes
- Clade: Angiosperms
- Clade: Monocots
- Clade: Commelinids
- Order: Poales
- Family: Restionaceae
- Genus: Centrolepis
- Species: C. fascicularis

Binomial name
- Centrolepis fascicularis Labill.

= Centrolepis fascicularis =

Species of flowering plant

Centrolepis fascicularis is a species of plant in the Restionaceae family.
