= Aphelia (rhetoric) =

Aphelia (Greek, "plainness") is a plainness of writing or speech. Aphelia is used to explain or teach rather than to entertain or elicit an emotional response.

== Style ==
The sentence structure is typically both short in length and lacks "poetic and rhetorical adornment." Parataxis and asyndeton are also expected within the plain style. Writing or speech using aphelia may display a "right-branching" sentence structure for the most part; that is, the sentence will begin with an independent clause that will be followed by at least one dependent clause.

== Examples ==
- "In plain prose, here are four whales as well known to the students of Cetacean History as Marius or Sylla to the classic scholar." — Herman Melville, Moby-Dick
- "I knew what the old man felt, and pitied him, but chuckled at heart." — Edgar Allan Poe, The Tell-Tale Heart
- "She presented all of the ordinary appearances of death. The face assumed the usual pinched and sunken outline. The lips were of usual marble pallor. The eyes were lustreless. There was no warmth. Pulsation had ceased." — Edgar Allan Poe, The Premature Burial

== See also ==
- Rhetoric
