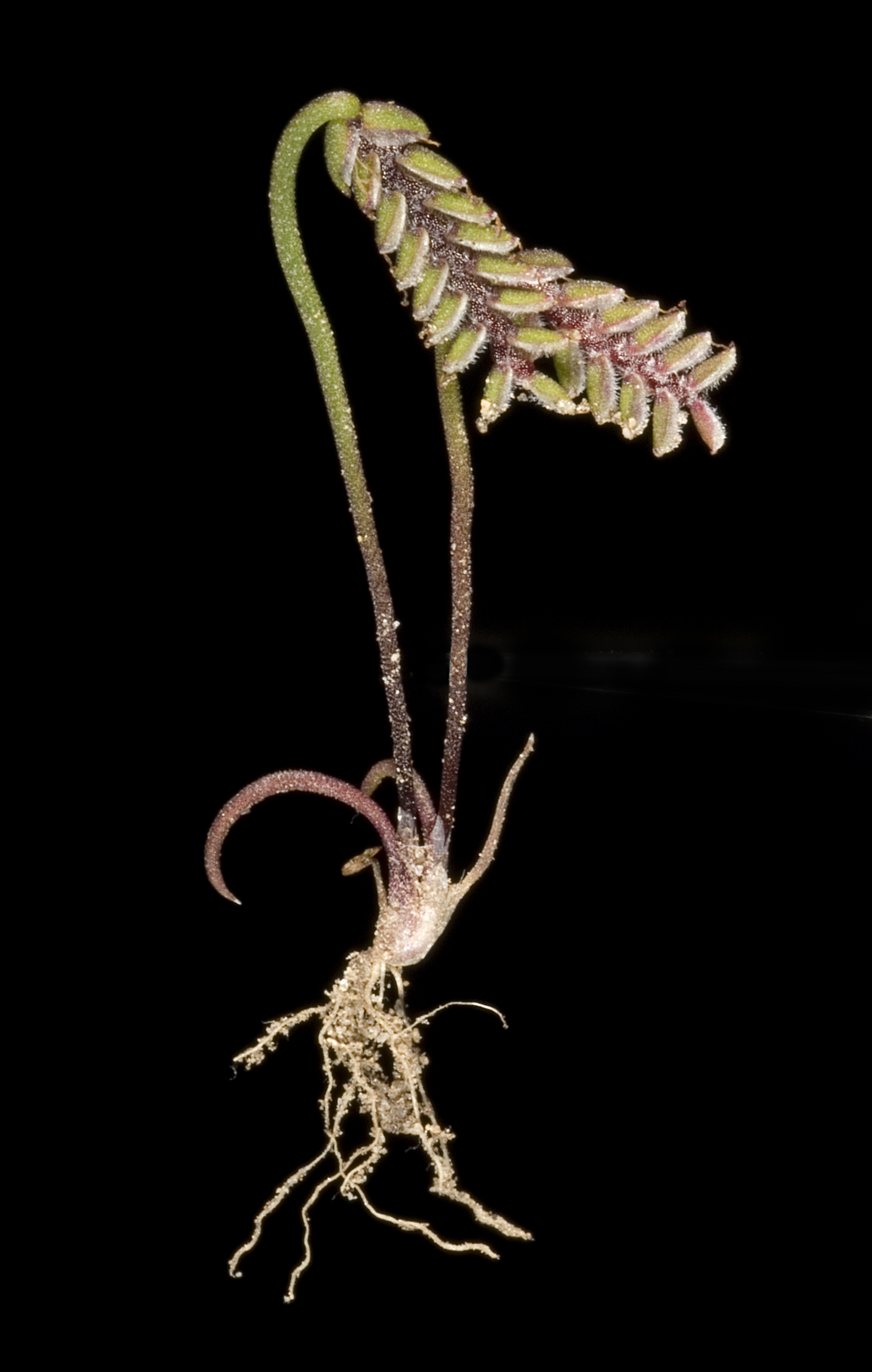
- Aphelia nutans

Scientific classification
- Kingdom: Plantae
- Clade: Tracheophytes
- Clade: Angiosperms
- Clade: Monocots
- Clade: Commelinids
- Order: Poales
- Family: Restionaceae
- Genus: Aphelia; R.Br.

Synonyms
- Brizula Hieron.

= Aphelia (plant) =

Genus of flowering plants

Aphelia is a genus of plants in the Restionaceae family. The entire genus is endemic to Australia. APG III system classifies this genus in the Centrolepidaceae family.

== Species ==
- Aphelia brizula F.Muell. - Western Australia
- Aphelia cyperoides R.Br. - Western Australia
- Aphelia drummondii (Hieron.) Benth - Western Australia
- Aphelia gracilis Sond. - South Australia, Tasmania, Victoria
- Aphelia nutans Hook.f. ex Benth - Western Australia
- Aphelia pumilio F.Muell. ex Sond. - South Australia, Tasmania, Victoria
