= Scream Silence =

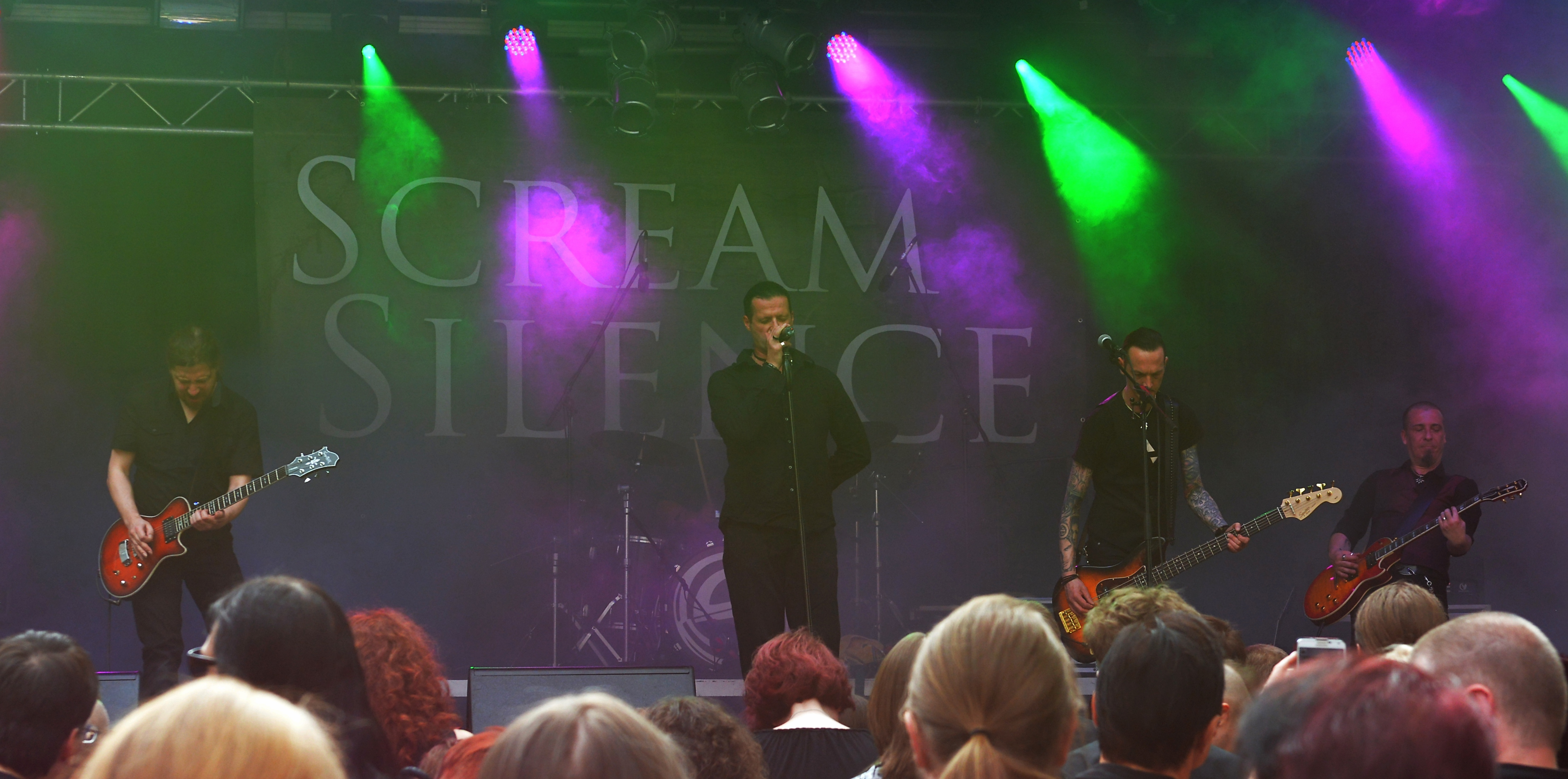
Scream Silence 2014

Scream Silence is a German gothic rock/alternative rock band that was founded 1998 in Berlin.

== History ==
Their first album "To Die For" was music magazine Orkus's album of the month. With the success of the first album, Scream Silence could go on tours with bands like Christian Death and Dreadful Shadows.

Two years later the successor, "The 2nd". On the subsequent tour they were the main band and they played in Wave-Gotik-Treffen. Without big promotion they released "Seven Tears" two years later and got excellent reviews from music magazines.

In spring 2004 they founded their own record label Plainsong Records and immediately began to work on their fourth album, "Elegy", which was released on October 25, 2004. Yuki Melchert (violin) and Anika Skusa (cello) had guest appearances.

On January 30, 2006 the successor "Saviourine" was finally released in Germany, and also in almost all of Central and Eastern Europe.

On April 20, 2007 the sixth album "Aphelia" was released.

Last album is "Heartburnt" released in 2015.

== Members ==
=== Current Line-Up ===
- Hardy Fieting (Vocals)
- Robert Klausch (Guitar)
- René Gödde (Guitar)
- Hagen Schneevoigt (Bass)
- Nestor de Valley (Drums)

=== Past members ===
- Cornel Otto (Bass)
- Rene Schulze (Bass)
- Joerg Rennewald (Guitar)
- Heiko Wolf (Drums)

=== Guest Members ===
- Yuki Melchert (violin)
- Anika Skusa (cello)

== Discography ==
=== Albums ===
- To Die For (1999)
- The 2nd (2001)
- Seven Tears (2003)
- Elegy (2004)
- Saviourine (2006)
- Aphelia (2007)
- Apathology (2008)
- Scream Silence (2012)
- Heartburnt (2015)

=== Singles ===
- "The Sparrows and The Nightingales" (2000)
- "Forgotten Days" (2001)
- "Curious Changes" (2004)
- "Creed" (2005)
- "Dreamer's Court" (2012)
- "Art Remains" (2015)
