= Tacheometry =

Archaic rapid surveying method

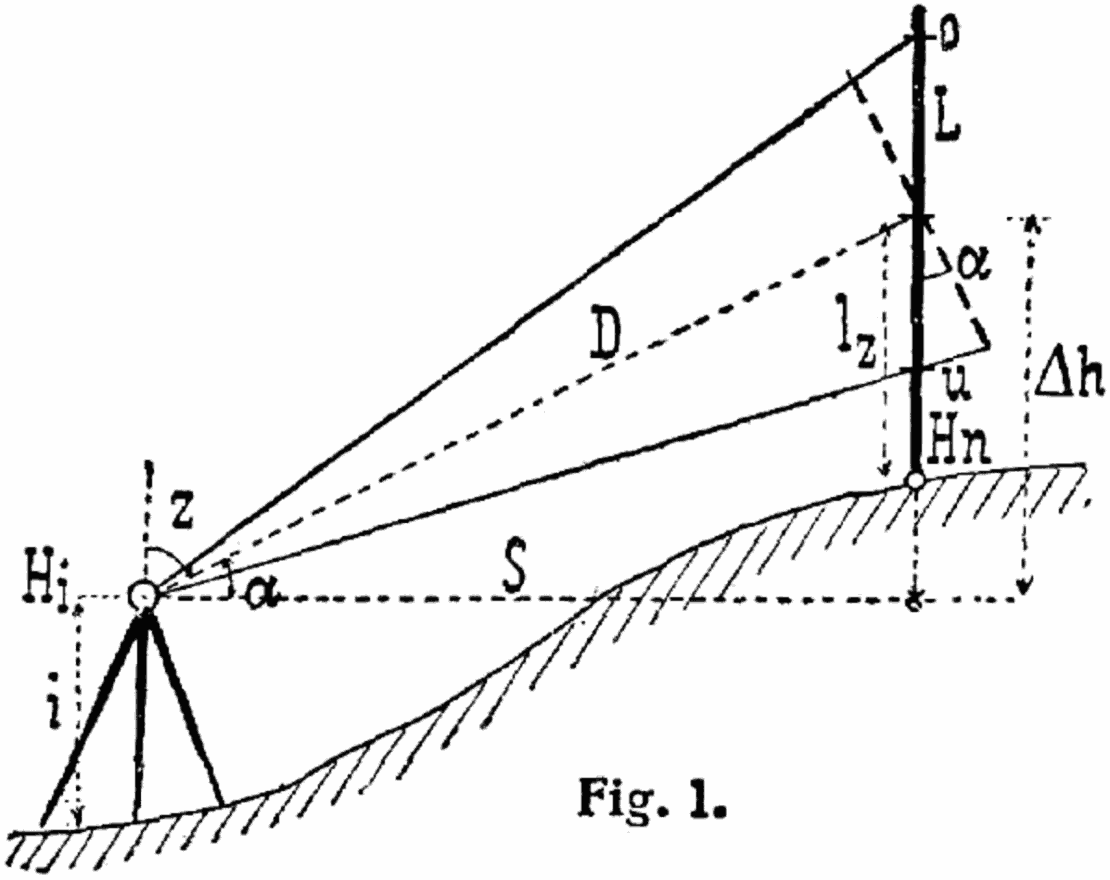
Diagram of measurements: D is the slant distance; S is the horizontal distance; Δh is the vertical distance.

Tacheometry (/ˌtækiˈɒmɪtri/; from Greek for "quick measure") is a system of rapid surveying, by which the horizontal and vertical positions of points on the Earth's surface relative to one another are determined using a tacheometer (a form of theodolite). It is used without a chain or tape for distance measurement and without a separate levelling instrument for relative height measurements.

Instead of the pole normally employed to mark a point, a staff similar to a level staff is used in tacheometry. This is marked with heights from the base or foot, and is graduated according to the form of tacheometer in use.

The ordinary methods of surveying with a theodolite, chain, and levelling instrument are fairly satisfactory when the ground is relatively clear of obstructions and not very precipitous, but it becomes extremely cumbersome when the ground is covered with bush, or broken up by ravines. Chain measurements then become slow and liable to considerable error; the levelling, too, is carried on at great disadvantage in point of speed, though without serious loss of accuracy. These difficulties led to the introduction of tacheometry.

In western countries, tacheometry is primarily of historical interest in surveying, as professional measurement nowadays is usually carried out using total stations and recorded using data collectors. Location positions are also determined using GNSS. Traditional methods and instruments are still in use in many areas of the world and by users who are not primarily surveyors.

== Use ==
The horizontal distance S is inferred from the vertical angle subtended between two well-defined points on the staff and the known distance 2L between them. Alternatively, also by readings of the staff indicated by two fixed stadia wires in the diaphragm (reticle) of the telescope. The difference of height Δh is computed from the angle of depression z or angle of elevation α of a fixed point on the staff and the horizontal distance S already obtained.

The azimuth angle is determined as normally. Thus, all the measurements requisite to locate a point both vertically and horizontally with reference to the point where the tacheometer is centred are determined by an observer at the instrument without any assistance beyond that of a person to hold the level staff.

== Specialized equipment ==
=== Stadia rod ===
Other forms of tacheometry in surveying include the use of a level staff known as a stadia rod with a theodolite or plane-table alidade. These use stadia marks on the instrument's reticle to measure the distance between two points on the stadia rod (the stadia interval). This is converted to distance from the instrument to the stadia rod by multiplying the stadia interval by the stadia interval factor. If the stadia rod is not at the same elevation as the instrument, the value must be corrected for the angle of elevation between the instrument and the rod.

The formula most widely used for finding the distances is:

$$d = ks + c$$

Here, $s$ is the stadia interval (top intercept minus bottom intercept); $k$ and $c$ are multiplicative and additive constants. Generally, the instrument is made so that $k = 100$ and $c = 0$ exactly, to simplify calculations.

=== Subtense bar ===
Another device used in tacheometry to measure distance between the measuring station and a desired point is the subtense bar. This is a rigid rod, usually of a material insensitive to change in temperature such as invar, of fixed length (typically 2 metres (6.6 ft)). The subtense bar is mounted on a tripod over the station to which the distance is desired. It is brought to level, and a small telescope on the bar enables the bar to be oriented perpendicular to the line of sight to the angle measuring station. Since the subtense bar is always 2m. The formula for the subtense bar is:

Horizontal distance = cot(θ/2)

A theodolite is used to measure the horizontal angle between indicators on the two ends of the subtense bar. The distance from the telescope to the subtense bar is the height of an isosceles triangle formed with the theodolite at the upper vertex and the subtense bar length at its base, determined by trigonometry.

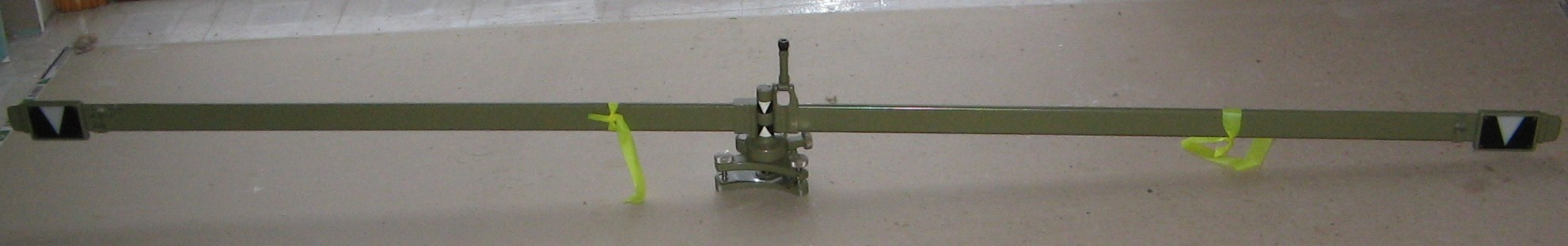
Wild brand subtense bar

=== Tacheometer ===
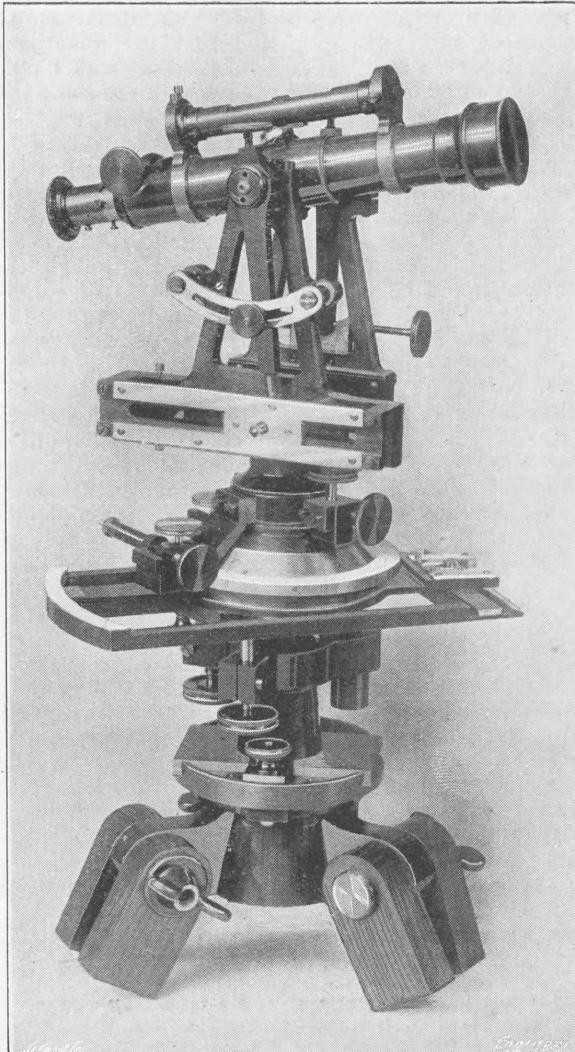
Historic tacheometer (1906)

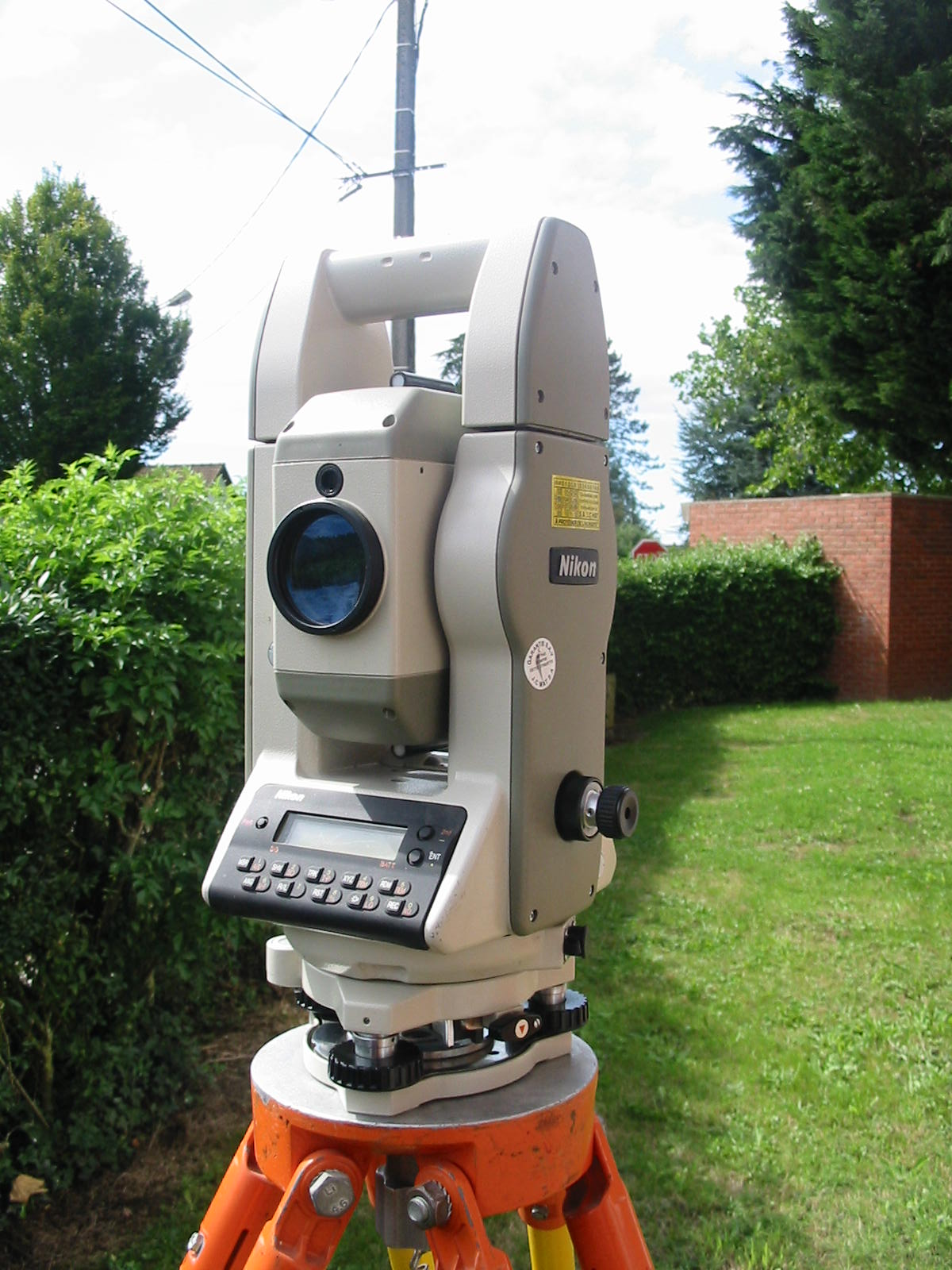
Modern tacheometer (2006)

A tachymeter or tacheometer is a type of theodolite used for rapid measurements and in modern form determines, electronically or electro-optically, the distance to target. The principles of action are similar to those of rangefinders.
