= Australian Height Datum =

Vertical datum of Australia

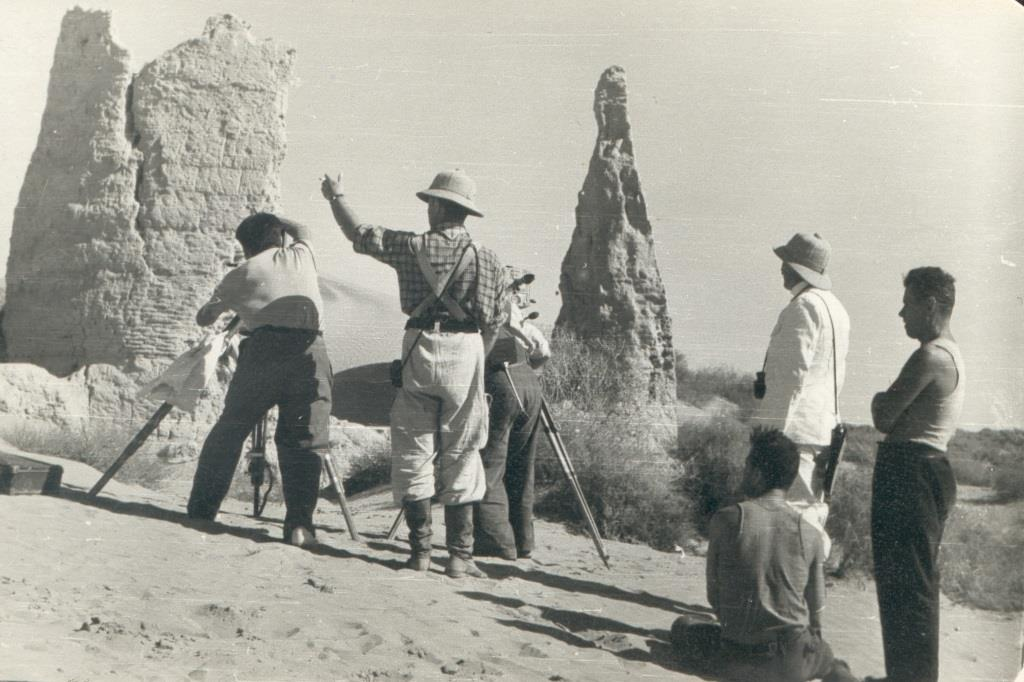
- Example of a surveying expedition in the 20th century similar to those undertaken to complete the Australian Height Datum.

General information
- Unit system: metric
- Unit of: height
- Date established: July 1971
- Reference network: The Australian National Levelling Network

The Australian Height Datum was introduced in 1971 as the official vertical datum for Australia, and thereby serves as the benchmark to which all height measurements are referred. The Australian Height Datum is an amalgamation of decades of spirit levelling work conducted by numerous state and territory authorities across the country, and was corrected to align with the mean sea level observations of thirty tide gauges positioned around the entire coastline. While it remains the published vertical datum for all surveying and engineering operations performed throughout Australia, newer technologies have uncovered numerous deficiencies, offsets and distortions within the Australian Height Datum, leading to discussions about defining a new Australian vertical datum.

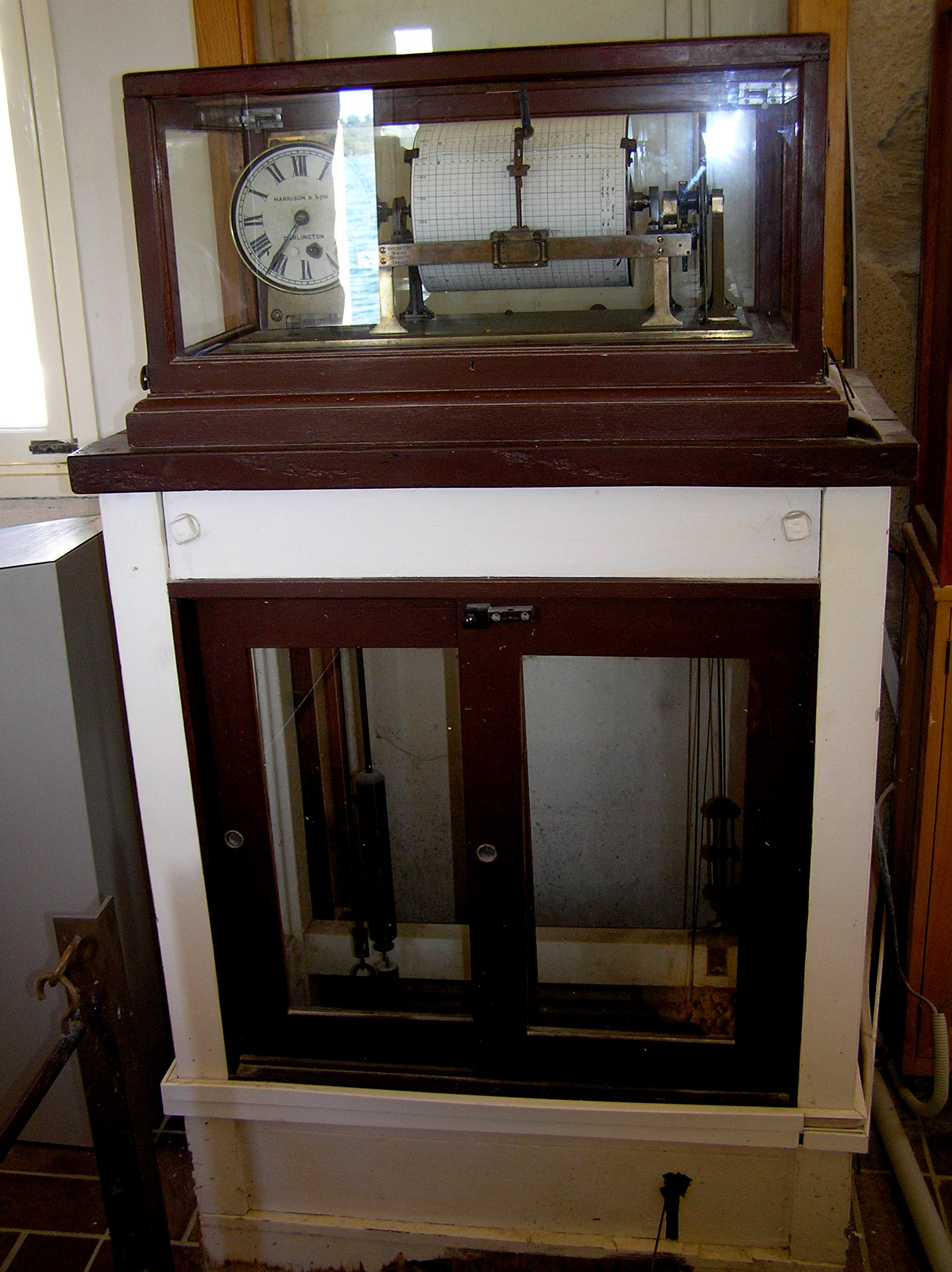
An old tide gauge positioned at Fort Denison, Sydney

== Background ==
=== The National Mapping Council (pre-1945) ===
Prior to the creation of the Australian Height Datum, levelling surveys were carried out by professional surveyors for construction and mapping purposes using only local or state-based vertical datums. The execution of military operations across the Australian mainland during World War II heavily exposed the lack of Australian topographic mapping, to such a great extent that Prime Minister Ben Chifley approved the formation of the National Mapping Council of Australia in 1945 with a primary objective of planning and managing the nation's topographic mapping activities. The inaugural National Mapping Council consisted of the Director of National Mapping, the Commonwealth Surveyor General and respective State Surveyors-General. The council's first meeting held discussions between the respective state authorities about the need to have a unified national scheme for surveying and mapping of Australia. Upon the meeting's completion, members of the National Mapping Council of Australia unanimously agreed that the Director of National Mapping, Frederick Johnston, would be tasked with the coordination of local, state and Commonwealth authorities in order to execute mapping activities across the entire of the Australian continent; an activity later named the Australian Levelling Survey.

=== The Australian National Levelling Network (1945–1971) ===
From 1945 to 1955, the New South Wales, Victorian and Western Australian state authorities, with assistance from the Royal Australian Survey Corps, commenced the Australian Levelling Survey by levelling 4,800 km of the mainland. By 1960, 20,800 km of controlled levelling had been completed with the addition of the Northern Territory and Queensland state authorities. To assist mining companies with the search for oil during the 1960s, the federal government made additional funds available to the Director of National Mapping to employ private contract surveyors to speed up the surveying effort. By 1970, the consolidation of levelling and tide gauge data from these collective surveying operations resulted in the formation of a 97,320 km "single homogenous network" of primary levelling spanning the entire country, named the Australian National Levelling Network. Through the linear adjustment of 757 primary levelling sections across the Australian National Levelling Network, while simultaneously "holding 30 tide gauges fixed at their mean sea level values", the Australian Height Datum was determined and then adopted by the National Mapping Council of Australia in July 1971.

== Measurements methodology ==
The Australian Height Datum is the vertical height of 0.000m established within the Australian National Levelling Network, through taking the mean sea level of 30 tide gauges along the entire Australian coastline during the period of 1966–1968. The datum surface is based upon a least squares adjustment of the original, "primary" levelling data spanning 97,320 km, combined with more recent, "supplementary" levelling data spanning 80,000 km.

=== Primary levelling observations ===
Five different observing authorities contributed to primary levelling sections in the Australian National Levelling Network that were used to determine the Australian Height Datum, each utilising their own levelling parties that conducted a combination of one-way and two-way levelling. These levelling parties consisted of two drivers of separate vehicles, as well as one instrument man who would alternate between the cars as they "leap-frog along the levelling route". This strategy involved the instrument man taking both a back sight and fore sight staff reading, before being driven by one of the drivers, past the other driver's stationary car, to the next set-up position to take the next set of reading. The two drivers’ responsibility was to hold the levelling staffs, while the instrument man would operate the level and record the readings in a level book. By employing this strategy, the levelling parties were able to achieve an average of 35 km of primary levelling each day. One-way levelling involved adopting this outlined methodology in only one direction, while two-way levelling also would repeat this again in the opposite direction to improve the accuracy of the readings. The following outlines the cumulative contribution of the levelling parties for their respective observing authority:

Primary levelling contributions to the Australian Height Datum by each observing authority
Primary levelling type (km)	Observing authority				
Primary levelling type (km)	State authorities (combined)	Division of National Mapping	Department of the Interior	Snowy Mountains Hydro-Electric Authority	Contractors
Original and second one-way levelling	697.0	4,203.8	23,590.0	0.0	19,613.5
First, second and third order two-way levelling	21,529.0	332.3	3,064.2	479.7	47,862.5

Positions of the 30 tide gauges used in the determination of the Australian Height Datum (mainland)

=== Mean sea level observations ===
Sea level data from thirty tidal gauges positioned around the Australian mainland coastline was also collected to derive the Australian Height Datum. The distances between each successive tidal gauge varied significantly around the country, with the smallest interval between Port Kembla and Camp Cove (128 km) and the largest interval between Point Lonsdale and Port Kembla (1,150 km). Sea level observations were conducted on an hourly basis from 1 January 1966 to 31 December 1968 for 29 of the designated tidal gauges, and from 1 January 1957 to 31 December 1960 for the single tidal gauge at Karumba, Queensland. Once all the tidal data was collected and processed, the Port MacDonnell tidal gauge station was selected to be the "nominal origin" and the station's mean sea level was assigned a value of 0.000 m. Zero condition equations between Port MacDonnell and the other 29 stations’ sea level data were then utilised to hold the mean sea level at 0.000 m across the entire national tide gauge network, while the primary and secondary levelling records within the Australian National Levelling Network were simultaneously adjusted to fit this model. In doing so, the Australian Height Datum surface was derived and officially adopted in 1971 as the benchmark to which all new vertical height measurements in Australia are referenced.

== Deficiencies, offsets and distortions ==
Since the inception of the Australian Height Datum in 1971, numerous deficiencies, distortions, offsets and other errors have been identified and examined using newer technologies. Due to Australia's desperate need for a surveying vertical control and accurate topographic mapping for mining exploration during the 1970s, the Australian Height Datum was constructed using a lower standard of spirit-levelling equipment and techniques to ensure completion in the shortest possible period of time. For example, approximately 80% (76520 km) of the primary levelling contributing to the Australian National Levelling Network was completed by private contractors during the 10-year period from 1960 to 1970. Since then, significant errors have been identified including the north–south slope of 1.5m, offset between Australia mainland and Tasmania of 26 cm, as well as regional distortions throughout Western Australia.

=== North-south slope ===
The north-south slope is a systematic error in the Australian Height Datum's horizontal surface of approximately 1.5m from the north coast to south coast of Australia. This tilt is problematic, as it invalidates the major assumption in using the Australian Height Datum: the datum surface has a gradient of zero (i.e. perfectly horizontal). While this systematic error is relatively insignificant for the design of "small-scale engineering projects" that use local heights, the north–south slope is very influential on the design of "large-scale studies" that span larger distances across the country. The north–south slope is primarily because the Australian Height Datum was taken as the fixed mean sea level of 30 tide gauges around Australia over a 2-year period, ignoring the natural variations in sea-surface topography. The National Mapping Council of Australia chose to use this "mean sea level" approach to minimise the use of negative heights, that are problematic for surveyors and engineers, near coastal areas where most of the population resides. By utilising the mean sea level approach, the creation of the Australian Height Datum neglected the significant influence the ocean's time-mean dynamic topography on the fluctuations in sea surface levels around the country. Spatial variation of sea level change, freshwater outflow in harbour areas where tide gauges are positioned, and an amalgamation of ocean dynamics have all contributed to the formation of a distinct 1.5m north-south slope within the Australian Height Datum. In order to counteract this slope, the AUSGeoid09 gravimetric quasigeoid model has been introduced to determine Australian Height Datum heights from global navigation satellite system (GNSS) readings. As GPS heights provide a far greater limit of reading that the magnitude of the spirit-level errors in the Australian Height Datum, the AUSGeoid09 model is able to "practically" eliminate the north–south error when converting GNSS readings to Australian Height Datum heights.

=== Mainland-Tasmania offset ===
The Australian Height Datum (Tasmania) is considered as a separate datum to the Australian Height Datum, consisting of a least-squares adjustment of seventy-two levelling sections across the Tasmanian state, while simultaneously assigning the mean sea level of two tidal gauges at Hobart and Burnie the vertical height of 0.000m over the year of 1972. This method deviates from the method employed to determine the mean sea level used to create the mainland Australian Height Datum, which was taken across the period from 1966 to 1968 for 29 of the tidal gauges and 1957-1960 for the single tidal gauge at Karumba. By employing inconsistent approaches to the study period of the mean sea level during the establishment of the two datums, the mean sea levels for the mainland and Tasmanian datums are highly likely to contain some degree of error relative to the true mean sea level value. This neglection of the differences in ocean's time-mean dynamic topography between the creation of Australian Height Datum (mainland) and Australian Height Datum (Tasmania) resulted in a distinct offset between the height of the mainland and Tasmania datum surfaces, estimated to be between −61 mm and +48 mm.

=== Regional distortions in Western Australia ===
In addition to the north–south slope, numerous other regional distortions within the Australian Height Datum have been identified across the state of Western Australia. The largest of these non-linear distortions are present across the Goldfields-Esperance and northern Kimberley regions. Unlike the well-defined and measurable north–south tilt across the state, the linear regression of these distortions does not lend itself to any distinct trends. Moreover, the utilising gravimetric quasigeoid models to "practically" eliminate the impact of the ocean's time-mean dynamic topography does not minimise the extent of these regional distortions. For these reasons, the regional distortions throughout Western Australia are attributed to random errors "present in the spirit-levelling observations" during the creation of the Australian Height Datum.
