= Stadiametric rangefinding =

Technique of measuring distances with a telescopic instrument

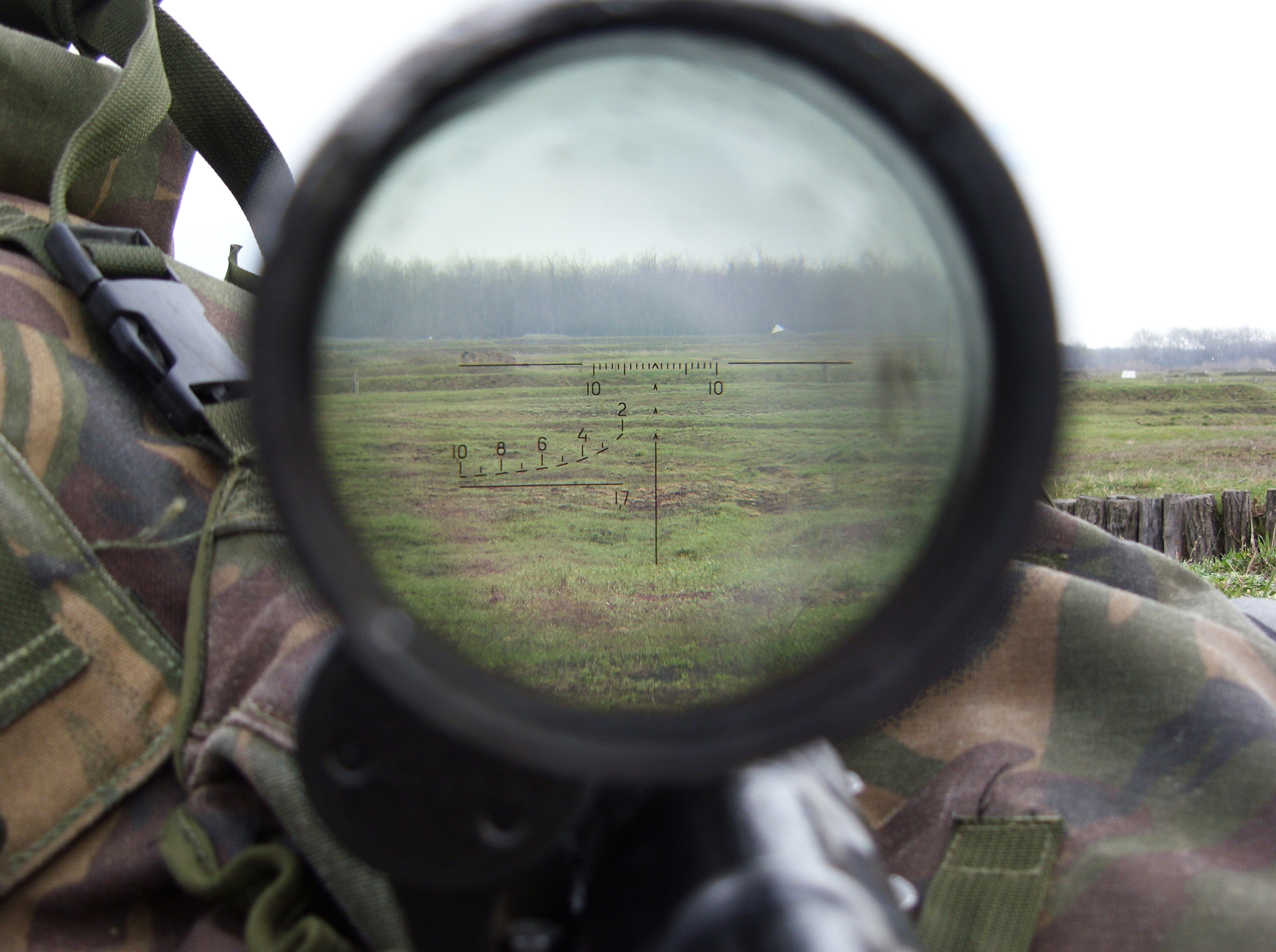

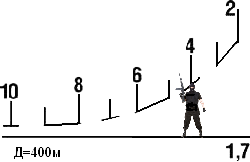
Soldier observed at 400 m: The stadiametric rangefinder in the bottom-left corner of the PSO-1 telescopic sight reticle can be used to determine the distance from a 1.70-meter (5 ft 7 in) tall person or object from 200 m (bracket number 2 to the right) to 1,000 m (bracket number 10 to the left).

Stadiametric rangefinding, also known as the stadia method or stadiametry, is a technique of measuring distances with a telescopic instrument. The term stadia comes from a Greek unit of length, Stadion (equal to 600 Greek feet, pous) which was the typical length of a sports stadium of the time. Stadiametric rangefinding is used for surveying and in the telescopic sights of firearms, artillery pieces, or tank guns, as well as some binoculars and other optics. It is still widely used in long-range military sniping, but in many professional applications it is being replaced with microwave, infrared, or laser rangefinding methods. Although much easier to use, electronic rangefinders can give away the shooter's position to a well-equipped adversary, and the need for accurate range estimation has existed long before compact, rugged electronic rangefinders were available for military use.

== Principle ==
Table for range estimation showing target sizes, distances and corresponding angular measurements. Angular sizes are given in milliradians (mil), ranges in meters, and target sizes are shown in both in centimeters, millimeters and inches.

Mil-dot reticle as used in telescopic sights.

• If the helmeted head of a man (≈ 0.25 m tall) fits between the fourth bar and the horizontal line, the man is at approximately 100 meters distance.
• When the upper part of the body of a man (≈ 1 m tall) fits under the first line, he stands at approximately 400 meters distance.

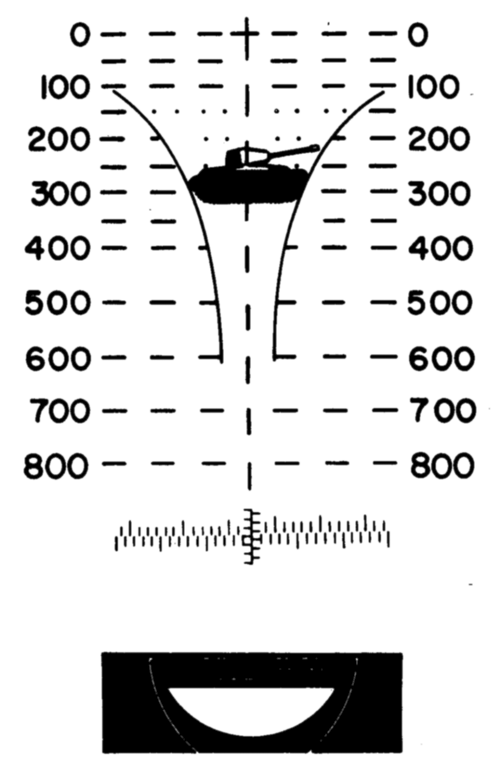
Targeting reticle of the M67 recoilless rifle, correctly ranging a tank at 275 m range. Antitank weapons of the 1940–70s used stadiametric range estimation based on the average sizes of armoured fighting vehicles

The stadia method is based upon the principle of similar triangles. This means that, for a triangle with a given angle, the ratio of opposite side length to adjacent side length (tangent) is constant. By using a reticle with marks of a known angular spacing, the principle of similar triangles can be used to find either the distance to objects of known size or the size of objects at a known distance. In either case, the known parameter is used, in conjunction with the angular measurement, to derive the length of the other side.

Stadiametric rangefinding often uses the milliradian ("mil" or "mrad") as the unit of angular measurement. Since a radian is defined as the angle formed when the length of a circular arc equals the radius of the circle, a milliradian is the angle formed when the length of a circular arc equals 1/1000 of the radius of the circle. For telescopic angles, the approximations of $\sin(\alpha) = \tan(\alpha) = \alpha$ greatly simplify the trigonometry, enabling one to scale objects measured in milliradians through a telescope by a factor of 1000 for distance or height. An object 5 meters high, for example, will cover 1 mrad at 5000 meters, or 5 mrad at 1000 meters, or 25 mrad at 200 meters. Since the radian expresses a ratio, it is independent of the units used; an object 6 feet high covering 1 mrad will be 6000 feet distant.

In practice, it can be seen that rough approximations may be made with a right triangle whose base (b) is equal to the distance of the 'rangefinder' from the eye; with the aperture (a) being the hole through which the target is sighted – the apex of this triangle being on the surface of the user's eye.

For a standard distance from the eye (b) of 28" (71.12 cm); this being the common length of an archer's draw:

28" × 1 milliradian ≈ 0.028" (0.071 cm) -- stadia factor 1000
10 milliradians ≈ 0.280" (0.711 cm) -- stadia factor x 100
100 milliradians ≈ 2.80" (7.112 cm) -- stadia factor x10

The approximate range of an object one foot (30.48 cm) in height covering roughly 100 milliradians is 10 feet (3.048 m) or:

Range (r) = approximate height of object (h) × (1000 ÷ aperture in milliradians (a))
r = h(1000/a) → where r and h are identical units, and a is in milliradians.
r = h/a → where r and h are identical units, and a is in radians

The above formula functions for any system of linear measure provided r and h are calculated with the same units.

== Surveying ==
Stadia readings used in surveying can be taken with modern instruments such as transits, theodolites, plane-table alidades and levels. When using the stadia measuring method, a level staff or stadia rod is held so that it appears between two stadia marks visible on the instrument's reticle. The stadia rod has measurements written on it that can be read through the telescope of the instrument, providing a known remote height for the distance calculations.

An instrument equipped for stadia work has two horizontal stadia marks spaced equidistant from the center crosshair of the reticle. The interval between stadia marks in most surveying instruments is 10 mrad and gives a stadia interval factor of 100. The distance between the instrument and a stadia rod can be determined simply by multiplying the measurement between the stadia hairs (known as the stadia interval) by 100.

The instrument must be level for this method to work directly. If the instrument line of sight is inclined relative to the staff, the horizontal and vertical distance components must be determined. Some instruments have additional graduations on a vertical circle to assist with these inclined measurements. These graduated circles, known as stadia circles, provide the value of the horizontal and the vertical measurements as a percentage of the inclined stadia measurement.

This system is sufficiently precise for locating topographic details such as rivers, bridges, buildings, and roads when an accuracy of 1/500 (0.2%, 2000ppm) is acceptable. Stadia readings are also used to provide repeated, independent observations for improved accuracy and to provide error checking against blunders in levelling.

The stadia method of distance measurement is primarily historical for surveying purposes, as distance nowadays is mostly measured by electronic or taping methods. Total station instruments do not have stadia lines marked on the reticle. Traditional methods are still used in areas where modern instruments are not common or by aficionados to antique surveying methods.

== See also ==
- Milliradian
- Rangefinder
- Stadimeter
