= Philadelphia rod =

A Philadelphia rod is a level staff used in surveying. The rod is used in levelling procedures to determine elevations and is read using a level.

A Philadelphia rod consists of two sliding sections graduated in hundredths of a foot. On the front of the rod the graduation increasing from zero at the bottom. On the back of the rod the graduation decrease from 13.09 ft at the bottom to 7 ft. The division of the device in two sliding sections are devised for ease of transport. Readings of 7 ft (2.1 m) or less, and up to 13 ft (4.0 m), can be measured. It has a rear section that slides on the front section. The rod must be fully extended, when higher measurements are needed to avoid reading errors. Distances of up to 250 ft (76 m) may be read.

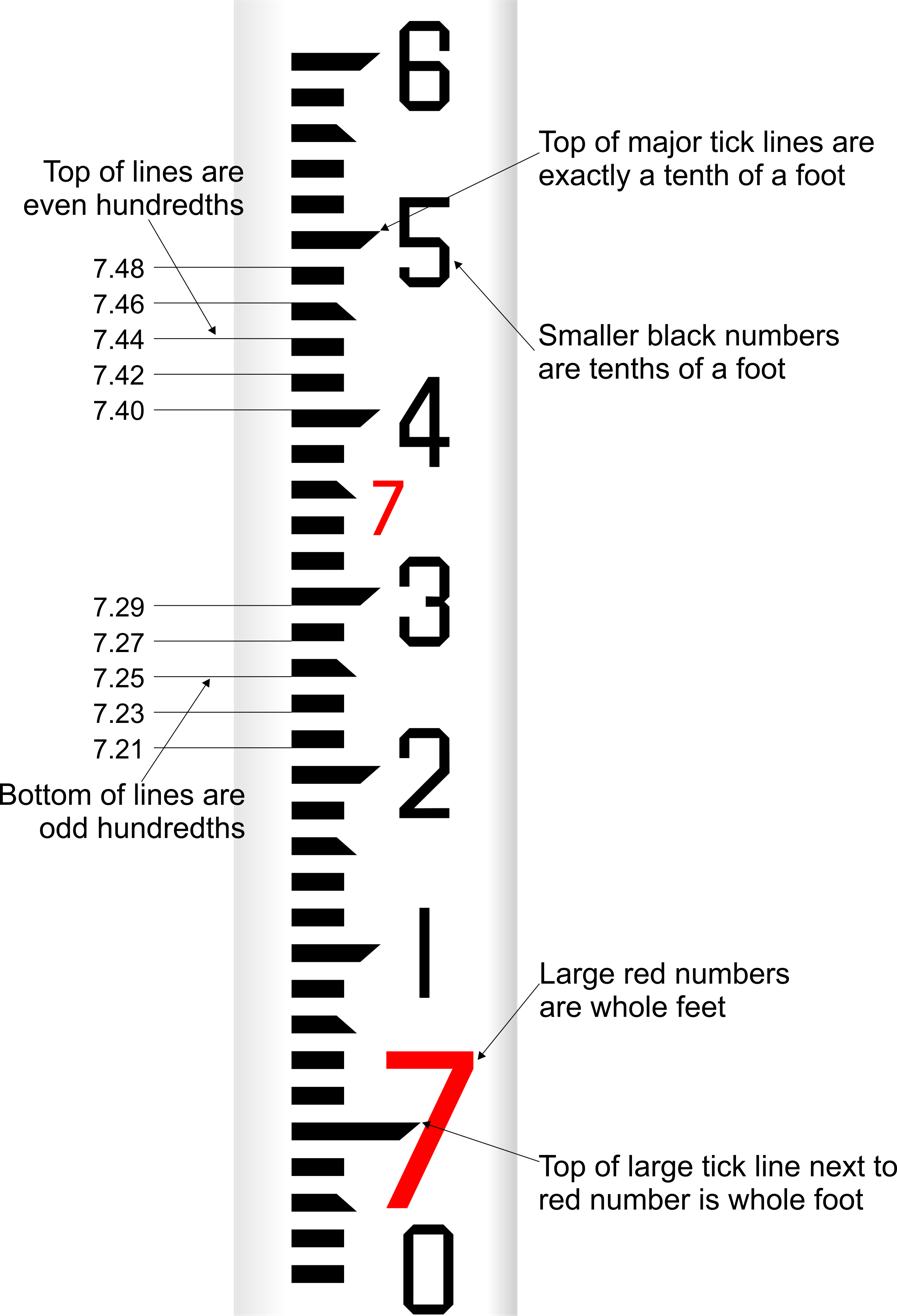
Reading a Philadelphia rod

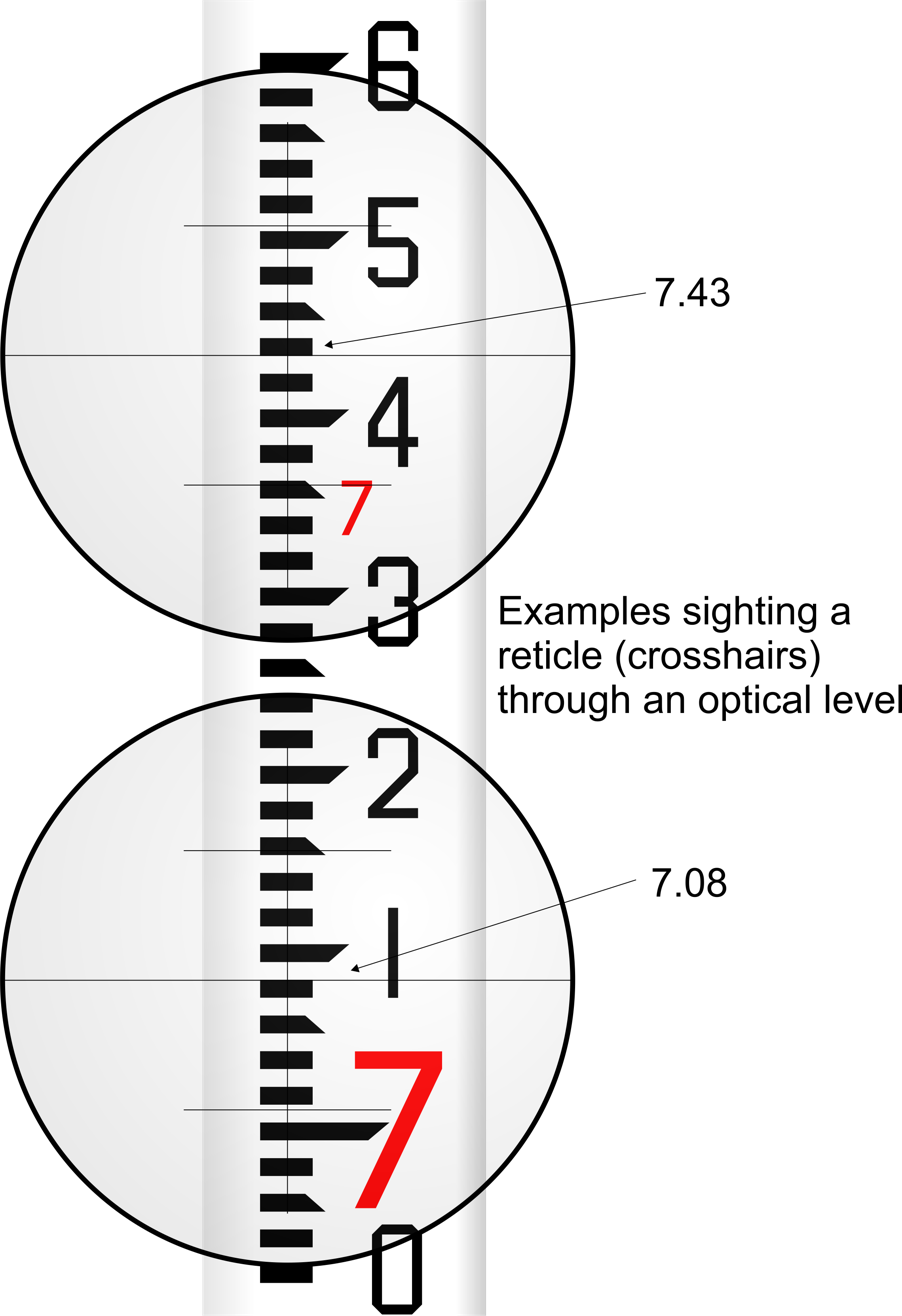
Philadelphia rod reading examples

The rod may be equipped with a target to increase the readable range of the rod. When the target is equipped with a Vernier scale measurements to the thousandths of a foot are possible. For readings less than 7 ft the target is attached on the bottom section of the rod and adjust by signals from level operator until the target is inline with the level's horizontal cross hair. For readings greater than 7 ft the target is attached to top section of the rod and the top section is raised/lowered until it the target intersects with the cross hair of the level. The rod is then locked and the zero of Vernier scale on the back of the rod will be aligned with the target's height.
