= Levelling =

Surveying technique

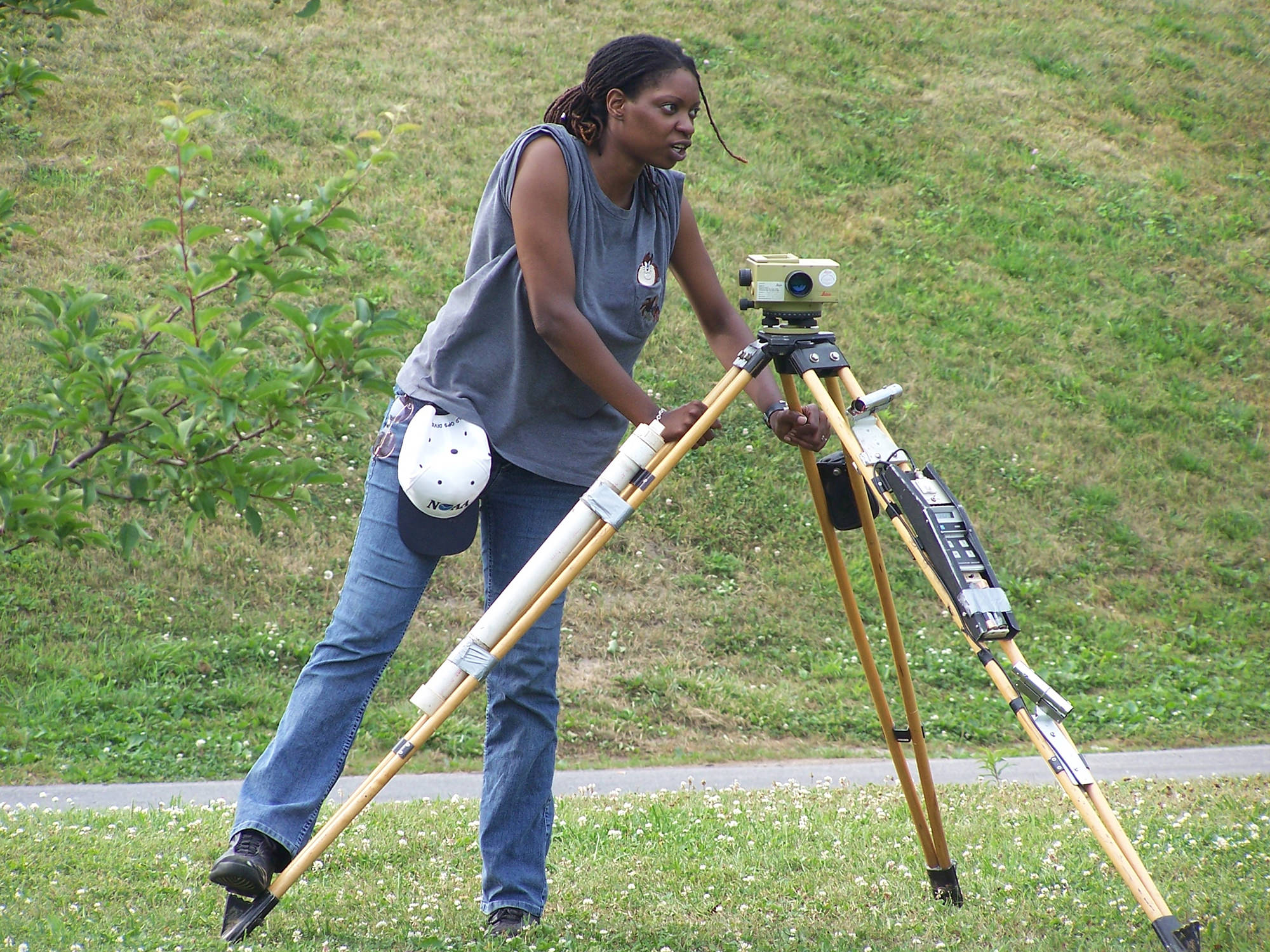
A wooden tripod holding an optical level is set up firmly on the ground.

Levelling or leveling (American English; see spelling differences) is a branch of surveying, the object of which is to establish or verify or measure the height of specified points relative to a datum. It is widely used in geodesy and cartography to measure vertical position with respect to a vertical datum, and in construction to measure height differences of construction artifacts.

== Optical levelling ==
Stadia marks on a crosshair while viewing a metric levelling rod or staff. The top mark is at 1,500 mm and the lower is at 1,345 mm; the distance between those two marks is 155 mm, yielding a distance to the rod of 15.5 m.

Optical levelling, also known as spirit levelling and differential levelling, employs an optical level, which consists of a precision telescope with crosshairs and stadia marks. The cross hairs are used to establish the level point on the target, and the stadia allow range-finding; stadia are usually at ratios of 100:1, in which case one metre between the stadia marks on the level staff (or rod) represents 100 metres from the target.

The complete unit is normally mounted on a tripod, and the telescope can freely rotate 360° in a horizontal plane. The surveyor adjusts the instrument's level by coarse adjustment of the tripod legs and fine adjustment using three precision levelling screws on the instrument to make the rotational plane horizontal. The surveyor does this with the use of a bull's eye level built into the instrument mount.

=== Procedure ===
Diagram showing relationship between two level staff, or rods, shown as 1 and 3. The level line of sight is 2.

The surveyor looks through the eyepiece of telescope while an assistant holds a vertical level staff which is graduated in inches or centimeters. The level staff is placed vertically using a level, with its foot on the point for which the level measurement is required. The telescope is rotated and focused until the level staff is plainly visible in the crosshairs. In the case of a high accuracy manual level, the fine level adjustment is made by an altitude screw, using a high accuracy bubble level fixed to the telescope. This can be viewed by a mirror whilst adjusting or the ends of the bubble can be displayed within the telescope, which also allows assurance of the accurate level of the telescope whilst the sight is being taken. However, in the case of an automatic level, altitude adjustment is done automatically by a suspended prism due to gravity, as long as the coarse levelling is accurate within certain limits. When level, the staff graduation reading at the crosshairs is recorded, and an identifying mark or marker placed where the level staff rested on the object or position being surveyed.

A typical procedure for a linear track of levels from a known datum is as follows. Set up the instrument within 100 metres (110 yards) of a point of known or assumed elevation. A rod or staff is held vertical on that point and the instrument is used manually or automatically to read the rod scale. This gives the height of the instrument above the starting (backsight) point and allows the height of the instrument (H.I.) above the datum to be computed. The rod is then held on an unknown point and a reading is taken in the same manner, allowing the elevation of the new (foresight) point to be computed. The difference between these two readings equals the change in elevation, which is why this method is also called differential levelling. The procedure is repeated until the destination point is reached. It is usual practice to perform either a complete loop back to the starting point or else close the traverse on a second point whose elevation is already known. The closure check guards against blunders in the operation, and allows residual error to be distributed in the most likely manner among the stations.

Some instruments provide three crosshairs which allow stadia measurement of the foresight and backsight distances. These also allow use of the average of the three readings (3-wire leveling) as a check against blunders and for averaging out the error of interpolation between marks on the rod scale. The resulting distance calculations can also be used to compensate for errors produced by unevenly spaced backsight and foresight readings.

The two main types of levelling are single-levelling as already described, and double-levelling (double-rodding). In double-levelling, a surveyor takes two foresights and two backsights and makes sure the difference between the foresights and the difference between the backsights are equal, thereby reducing the amount of error. Double-levelling costs twice as much as single-levelling.

==== Turning a level ====
When using an optical level, the endpoint may be out of the effective range of the instrument. There may be obstructions or large changes of elevation between the endpoints. In these situations, extra setups are needed. Turning is a term used when referring to moving the level to take an elevation shot from a different location.

To "turn" the level, one must first take a reading and record the elevation of the point the rod is located on. While the rod is being kept in exactly the same location, the level is moved to a new location where the rod is still visible. A reading is taken from the new location of the level and the height difference is used to find the new elevation of the level gun. This is repeated until the series of measurements is completed.

The level must be horizontal to get a valid measurement. Because of this, if the horizontal crosshair of the instrument is lower than the base of the rod, the surveyor will not be able to sight the rod and get a reading. The rod can usually be raised up to 25 feet high, allowing the level to be set much higher than the base of the rod.

== Trigonometric levelling ==
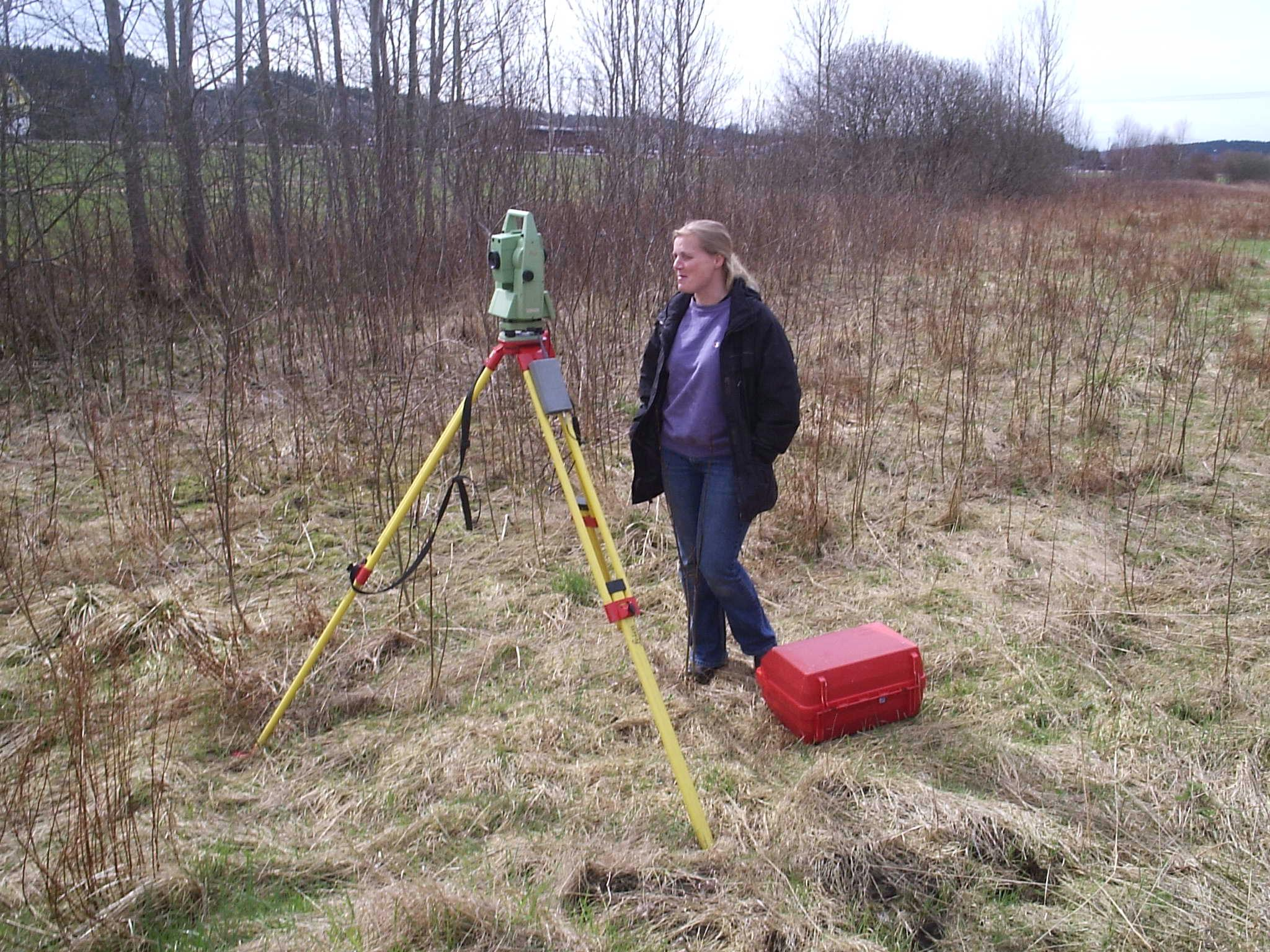
Archaeological survey using a Leica TPS1100 total station on an Iron Age dwelling in Ytterby, Sweden.

The other standard method of levelling in construction and surveying is called trigonometric levelling, which is preferred when levelling "out" to a number of points from one stationary point. This is done by using a total station, or any other instrument to read the vertical, or zenith angle to the rod, and the change in elevation is calculated using trigonometric functions (see example below). At greater distances (typically 1,000 feet and greater), the curvature of the Earth, and the refraction of the instrument wave through the air must be taken into account in the measurements as well (see section below).

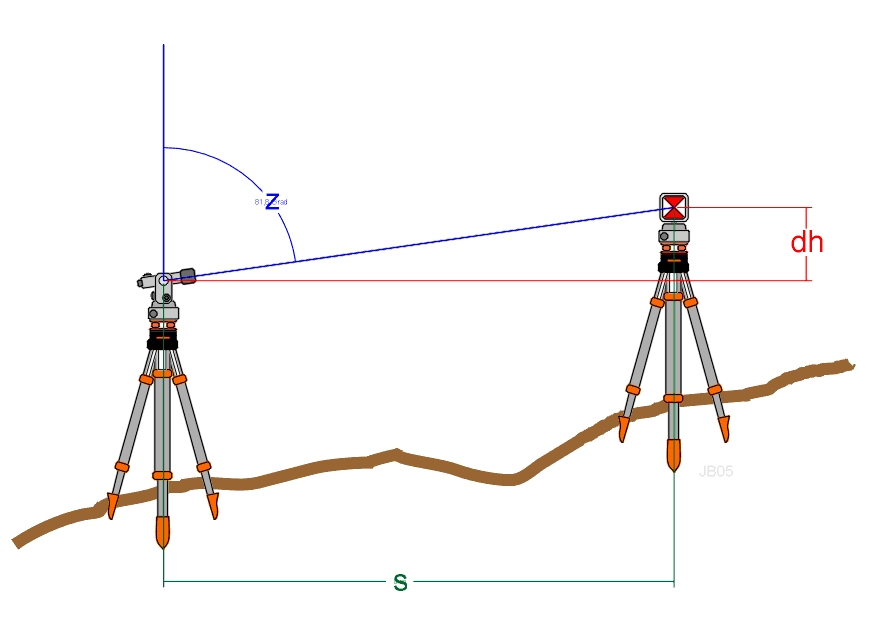
Formulation of trigonometric levelling

Ex: an instrument at Point A reading to a rod at Point B a zenith angle of < 88°15'22" (degrees, minutes, seconds of arc) and a slope distance of 305.50 feet not factoring rod or instrument height would be calculated thus:

cos(88°15'22")(305.5)≈ 9.30 ft.,

meaning an elevation change of approximately 9.30 feet in elevation between Points A and B. So if Point A is at 1,000 feet of elevation, then Point B would be at approximately 1,009.30 feet of elevation, as the reference line (0°) for zenith angles is straight up going clockwise one complete revolution, and so an angle reading of less than 90 degrees (horizontal or flat) would be looking uphill and not down (and opposite for angles greater than 90 degrees), and so would gain elevation.

== Refraction and curvature ==
The curvature of the earth means that a line of sight that is horizontal at the instrument will be higher and higher above a spheroid at greater distances. The effect may be insignificant for some work at distances under 100 meters. The increase in height of a straight line with distance D is:

$$\sqrt{D^2+R^2}-R\approx\frac{D^2}{2R}\approx 0.0785\,\text{m}\left(\frac{D}{1\,\text{km}}\right)^2 \approx 0.0239\,\text{ft} \left(\frac{D}{1000\,\text{ft}}\right)^2$$

where R is the radius of the earth.

The line of sight is horizontal at the instrument, but is not a straight line because of atmospheric refraction. The change of air density with elevation causes the line of sight to bend toward the earth.

The combined correction for refraction and curvature is approximately:

$$\Delta h = 0.067\,\text{m} \left(\frac{D}{1\,\text{km}}\right)^2 = 0.021\,\text{ft} \left(\frac{D}{1000\,\text{ft}}\right)^2$$

For precise work these effects need to be calculated and corrections applied. For most work it is sufficient to keep the foresight and backsight distances approximately equal so that the refraction and curvature effects cancel out. Refraction is generally the greatest source of error in leveling. For short level lines the effects of temperature and pressure are generally insignificant, but the effect of the temperature gradient dT / dh can lead to errors.

== Levelling loops and gravity variations ==
Assuming error-free measurements, if the Earth's gravity field were completely regular and gravity constant, leveling loops would always close precisely:

$$\sum_{i=0}^n \Delta h_i = 0$$

around a loop. In the real gravity field of the Earth, this happens only approximately; on small loops typical of engineering projects, the loop closure is negligible, but on larger loops covering regions or continents it is not.

Instead of height differences, geopotential differences do close around loops:

$$\sum_{i=0}^n \Delta h_i g_i,$$

where $g_i$ stands for gravity at the leveling interval i. For precise leveling networks on a national scale, the latter formula should always be used.

$$\Delta W_i = \Delta h_i g_i\$$

should be used in all computations, producing geopotential values $W_i$ for the benchmarks of the network.

High precision levelling, especially when combined with gravimetry data, is called geodetic levelling; it is used for the establishment and maintenance of vertical datums over long distances.

== Instruments ==
=== Classical instruments ===
The dumpy level was developed by English civil engineer William Gravatt, while surveying the route of a proposed railway line from London to Dover. More compact and hence both more robust and easier to transport, it is commonly believed that dumpy levelling is less accurate than other types of levelling, but such is not the case. Dumpy levelling requires shorter and therefore more numerous sights, but this fault is compensated by the practice of making foresights and backsights equal.

Precise level designs were often used for large leveling projects where utmost accuracy was required. They differ from other levels in having a very precise spirit level tube and a micrometer adjustment to raise or lower the line of sight so that the crosshair can be made to coincide with a line on the rod scale and no interpolation is required.

=== Automatic level ===
Automatic levels make use of a compensator that ensures that the line of sight remains horizontal once the operator has roughly leveled the instrument (to within maybe 0.05 degree). The compensator consists of small prisms suspended from wires inside of the level's chassis that are connected together in the shape of a pendulum. This allows for only horizontal light rays to enter, even in cases where the telescope of the instrument is not perfectly plumb.

The surveyor sets the instrument up quickly and does not have to re-level it carefully each time they sight on a rod on another point. It also reduces the effect of minor settling of the tripod to the actual amount of motion instead of leveraging the tilt over the sight distance. Because the level of the instrument only needs to be adjusted once per setup, the surveyor can quickly and easily read as many side-shots as necessary between turns. Three level screws are used to level the instrument, as opposed to the four screws historically found in dumpy levels.

=== Laser level ===
Laser levels project a beam which is visible and/or detectable by a sensor on the leveling rod. This style is widely used in construction work but not for more precise control work. An advantage is that one person can perform the levelling independently, whereas other types require one person at the instrument and one holding the rod.

The sensor can be mounted on earth-moving machinery to allow automated grading.

== See also ==
- Astrogeodetic levelling
- Dynamic height
- Glossary of levelling terms
- Hydrostatic levelling
- Land levelling
- Orthometric height
- Physical geodesy
- Survey camp
