= M67 recoilless rifle =

American type of recoilless rifle

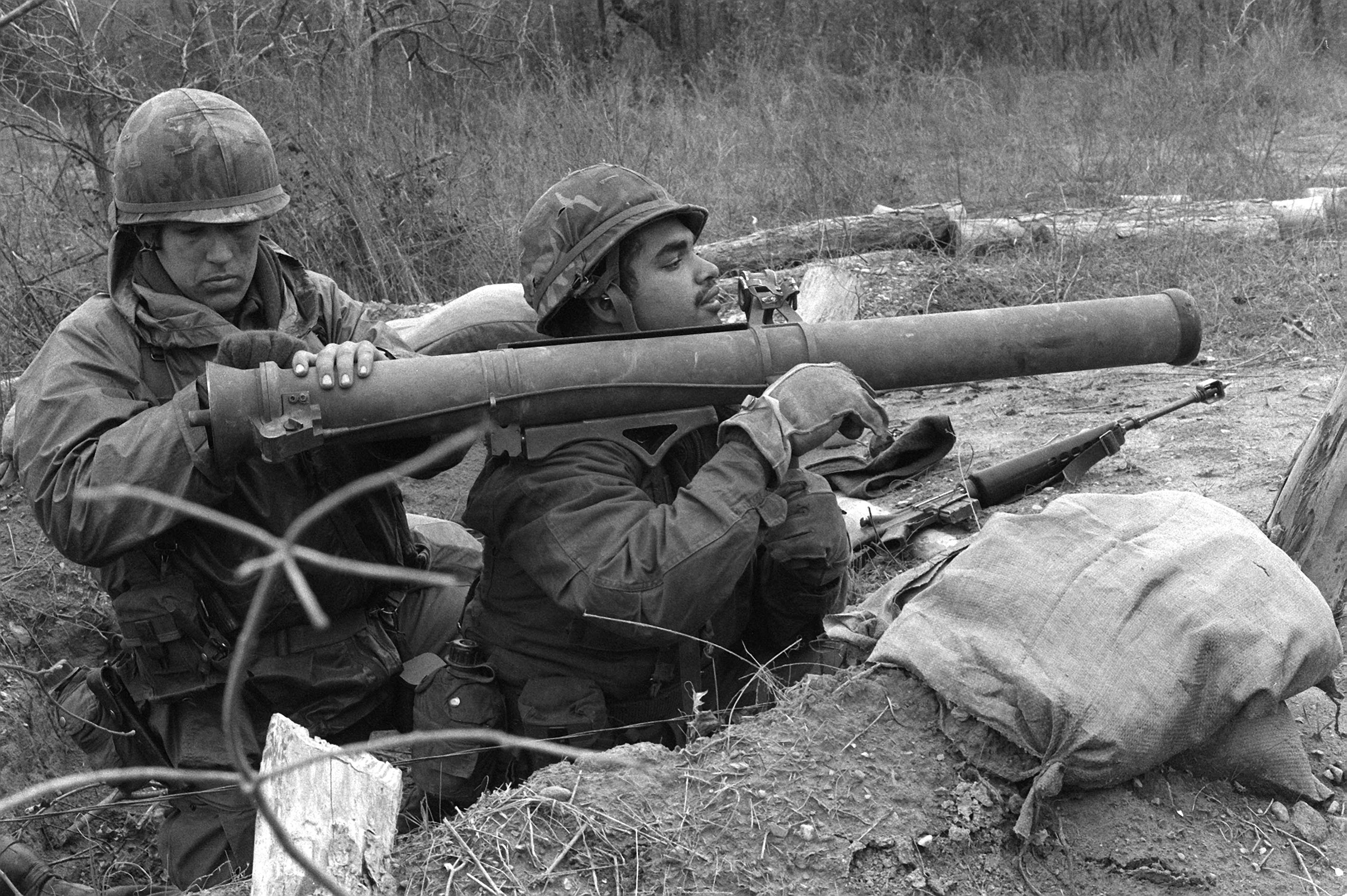
- The M67 recoilless rifle
- Type: Recoilless rifle
- Place of origin: United States

Service history
- In service: 1960s–present
- Wars: Vietnam War; Cambodian Civil War; Laotian Civil War; Lebanese Civil War; Nicaraguan Revolution; Salvadoran Civil War; Third Indochina War; Soviet–Afghan War; Falklands War; United States invasion of Grenada; United States invasion of Panama; 1989 Philippine coup d'état attempt; Gulf War; War in Afghanistan; Moro conflict

Specifications
- Mass: 37.5 lb (17 kg) Empty; 46.7 lb (21.2kg) Loaded
- Length: 53 in (1,346 mm)
- Height: 17 in (432 mm)
- Crew: 3 – Gunner, Assistant gunner, Ammunition bearer
- Cartridge weight: 9.25 lb (4.2 kg) HEAT round; 6.79 lb (3.08kg) HE round
- Caliber: 3.54 in (90 mm)
- Action: 13.7 in (350 mm) against RHA; 31.5 in (800 mm) against concrete
- Rate of fire: 1-2 rpm
- Muzzle velocity: 700 ft/s (213 m/s)
- Effective firing range: 328 yd (300 m)
- Maximum firing range: 2,300 yd (2,100 m)
- Sights: 3x M103 Telescopic sight with stadia lines

The M67 recoilless rifle is a 90 mm (3.55 inch) anti-tank recoilless rifle made in the United States and later in South Korea. It could also be employed in an anti-personnel role with the use of the M590 antipersonnel round. It was designed to be fired primarily from the ground using the bipod and monopod, but could also be fired from the shoulder using the folded bipod as a shoulder rest and the monopod as a front grip. The weapon was air-cooled and breech-loaded, and fired fixed ammunition. It is a direct fire weapon employing stadia lines to allow simple range finding, based on a typical tank target bridging the lines once in range.

== History and use ==
Adopted in 1959 in Army service, the M67 was used in the Vietnam War together with the much larger 106 mm M40. The M67 proved an effective weapon, though it was primarily used against personnel in combat, and saw little or no use against armor and even against fortifications. While troops praised its effectiveness, the M67 came under heavy criticism due to the weapon's weight and length as well as its backblast, which often precluded its use in offensive operations. Because of these disadvantages, the Marine Corps units continued to use the old M20 Super Bazooka in preference to the M67. It was largely replaced in Army service by the M47 Dragon anti-tank missile system starting in 1975. The M67 was also issued to anti-armour platoons of 1 ATF (Australian/New Zealand Task Force) during the Vietnam war, being used near the perimeter of the defense bases due to its weight. The M67 was issued in lieu of the standard issue Carl Gustav for these armies. This may have been to simplify logistics, or it may be that ammunition for the Carl Gustav could not be sourced due to Swedish opposition to the war in Vietnam.

The M67 was not completely withdrawn from infantry service. Instead, it was retained as a substitute standard antitank weapon for special tasks or battle environments. Since the batteries of the Dragon and the wires of the TOW could fail due to extremely low temperatures, the M67 was used for units deploying to arctic environments and remained in many infantry units in West Germany, such as the 1st Battalion, 15th Infantry, 3rd Infantry Division. Also, VII Corps Combat Engineer Battalions were using the M67 as their main anti-armor weapon during the mid-1980s. Heavy Physical Security Military Police Companies used the M67 on Special Weapons Sites in West Germany as an anti-vehicular weapon. These weapons were issued 6 per company, 2 per platoon for each combat engineer company. Until the 1990s, the 6th Light Infantry Division in Alaska was still using the M67 in its special weapons platoons. Two M67s were used by C Co 5/87th (Lt Infantry) 193rd Infantry Brigade during Operation Just Cause in the Republic of Panama in 1989, using the M590 antipersonnel ammunition. Similarly, the urban environment of West Berlin prompted the Army to keep the weapon with the 4th, 5th and 6th Battalions of the 502nd Infantry Regiment, Berlin Brigade, as late as winter 1991; the M47 Dragon replaced it in January 1992. The Army Rangers retained the M67 in their weapons platoons until the 1990s, when it was replaced by the 84 mm M3 Carl Gustav; Ranger M67s played a key role in knocking out two BTR-60 APCs of the People's Revolutionary Army in Grenada during Operation Urgent Fury in 1983. Lastly, Combat Engineer units used the M67 as a demolition gun to destroy bunkers and other hard point targets as part of their MTOE (Modified Table Of Organization & Equipment) at least as late as 1990.

The Salvadoran Army received 379 M67s between 1981 and 1992 and used them in urban warfare against the FMLN rebels. The Argentine Army also fielded some M67s during the Falklands War. Royal Saudi Land Forces fielded M67s against Iraq during Gulf War.

In February 2011, it was reported that stocks of surplus M67 recoilless rifles were reintroduced to the 101st Airborne Division for limited combat service in Afghanistan. Numbers of these weapons were issued to the 506th Infantry Regiment, "Currahee", 4th Brigade Combat Team, for use against fortifications, and concentrations of enemy personnel. The M67 was issued in response to a demand for a reloadable shoulder-fired weapon to be used in static defensive positions as well as ambushes. In particular, the flechette anti-personnel round saw common usage. The M67s were eventually phased out again as the Army expanded issuing of the M3 Carl Gustav recoilless rifle to regular infantry units.

== Production ==
It was designed by the Midwest Research Institute in Kansas City, Missouri. It was also produced in South Korea by Kia Motors, while rounds were manufactured by Poongsan Corporation. Additionally, a licensed version was made in Greece, the EM-67.

== Description ==
The M67 is shaped like a long tube with the sight assembly and trigger offset to the side in opposite directions about halfway along the barrel. Under this point is the monopod, with the bipod halfway back from there. The weapon requires a crew of three to operate it; a gunner, assistant gunner (loader) and ammunition bearer. The breech is hinged on the right side, and has to be swung open to load the round. It is then swung closed and when the rifle is fired, the rear end of the shell case breaks up and is blown out of the back of the breech block. On the left side of the barrel, near the sight and trigger assemblies, is an asbestos heat shield to protect the gunner's shoulder and neck from the heat of the barrel when firing.

It is capable of maintaining a sustained fire rate of one round per minute, but the weapon could also be rapid fired at an increased rate of one round every six seconds (10 rpm) by a well trained crew. The rapid firing is limited to five rounds, with a mandatory 15 minute cool-off period afterward.

The M49A1 sub-caliber device, which uses NATO 7.62 mm rounds, is typically used for zeroing the sight and for qualifying purposes. The sight is visually zeroed by setting crossed strings over the gun barrel opening (a rubber loop and notches at the end of the barrel facilitate holding the string in the correct position), then looking through the barrel of the sub-caliber device (and crossed strings) and setting the fixed stadia, reticle sight to the same target. The sub-caliber rounds can then be used to further refine the zero and to qualify.

== Ammunition ==
Ammunition for the 90 mm rifle was issued in complete fixed cartridges. The term "fixed" means that the projectile and the cartridge case are crimped together. This ensures correct alignment of the projectile and the cartridge case. It also permits faster loading because the projectile and the cartridge case are loaded as one unit. The rear end of the cartridge case is made of frangible material that is completely destroyed when fired. The projectiles used are pre-engraved with a rifling band, that is, the rotating bands are cut to engage the rifled bore both to trap gases and to spin-stabilize the projectile.

=== TP M371 practice round ===
The TP M371 is a practice round for the M371A1 HEAT round. It has the high explosive filler replaced with inert ballast to keep it at the same weight and flight properties. The nose cap contains a smoke pellet to mark the point of impact.

- Cartridge weight: 9.25 lb (4.2 kg)
- Cartridge length: 28.10 in (714 mm)
- Projectile weight: 6.75 lb (3.06 kg)
- Muzzle velocity: 700 ft/s (213 m/s)
- Maximum effective range: 437 yd (400 m)
- Fuse: PIBD M530A1

=== M371A1 HEAT round ===
The M371A1 round utilizes a special fin-stabilized projectile which employs the shaped charge principle to defeat armor. It does not depend upon the warhead's velocity at the moment of impact for its effect, relying instead on the focusing effect of the shape of its explosive filler. The explosive charge collapses a conical metal liner inside the warhead into an extremely high-velocity superplastic jet. This superplastic jet is capable of penetrating steel armor to a depth of seven or more times the diameter of the explosive charge. The end of the projectile is a long and narrow stand-off of a length that allows the HEAT warhead to achieve maximum effect against the target.

The M371A1 HEAT round is used primarily against armor. It can also be used against secondary targets such as gun emplacements and pillboxes with excellent results. It is capable of penetrating 1.15 ft (350 mm) of armor plate (steel), 3.5 ft (1.1 m) of packed soil, or 2.5 ft (0.8 m) of reinforced concrete.

- Cartridge weight: 9.25 lb (4.2 kg)
- Cartridge length: 28.10 in (714 mm)
- Projectile weight: 6.75 lb (3.06 kg)
- Muzzle velocity: 700 ft/s (213 m/s)
- Maximum effective range: 437 yd (400 m)
- Fuse: PIBD M530A1

=== M590 Anti-personnel Canister ===
The Antipersonnel (Canister) Cartridge M590 (XM590E1) or M590 cartridge is a flechette round designed for close-in defense against massed infantry attacks. The cartridge consists of an aluminum cartridge case crimped to an aluminum canister. The canister consists of a thin-walled, deep-drawn, aluminum body that contains a payload of 2,400 eight-grain (0.5 g), low-drag, fin-stabilized, steel-wire flechettes. When the canister leaves the muzzle, the pressure ruptures the canister along inscribed score marks to release the flechettes, which disperse in a cone angle of approximately 8 degrees.

- Cartridge weight: 6.79 lb (3.08 kg)
- Cartridge length: 19.19 in (487 mm)
- Projectile weight: 3.97 lb (1.8 kg)
- Muzzle velocity: 1,250 ft/s (381 m/s)
- Maximum effective range: 328 yd (300 m)
- Fuse: none

=== M591 Antipersonnel round ===
The M591 is an HE round with a muzzle velocity of 475 metres per second (1,560 ft/s).

== Performance relative to comparable weapons ==
Weapon	Diameter	Muzzle Velocity	Warhead	Armor penetration (est.)	Effective Range	Sight
M67	90 mm	213 m/s	3.06 kg HEAT	350 mm	300 m	3×
M2 Carl Gustaf	84 mm	255 m/s	1.70 kg HEAT	400 mm	450 m	2×
LRAC F1	89 mm	295 m/s	2.20 kg HEAT	400 mm	500 m	3x
RPG-7	93 mm	115 m/s	2.60 kg HEAT	500 mm	300 m	2.7×
B-300	82 mm	280 m/s	3.00 kg HEAT	400 mm	400 m	N/A

Data is from Jane's Infantry Weapons 1984–85

== Users ==
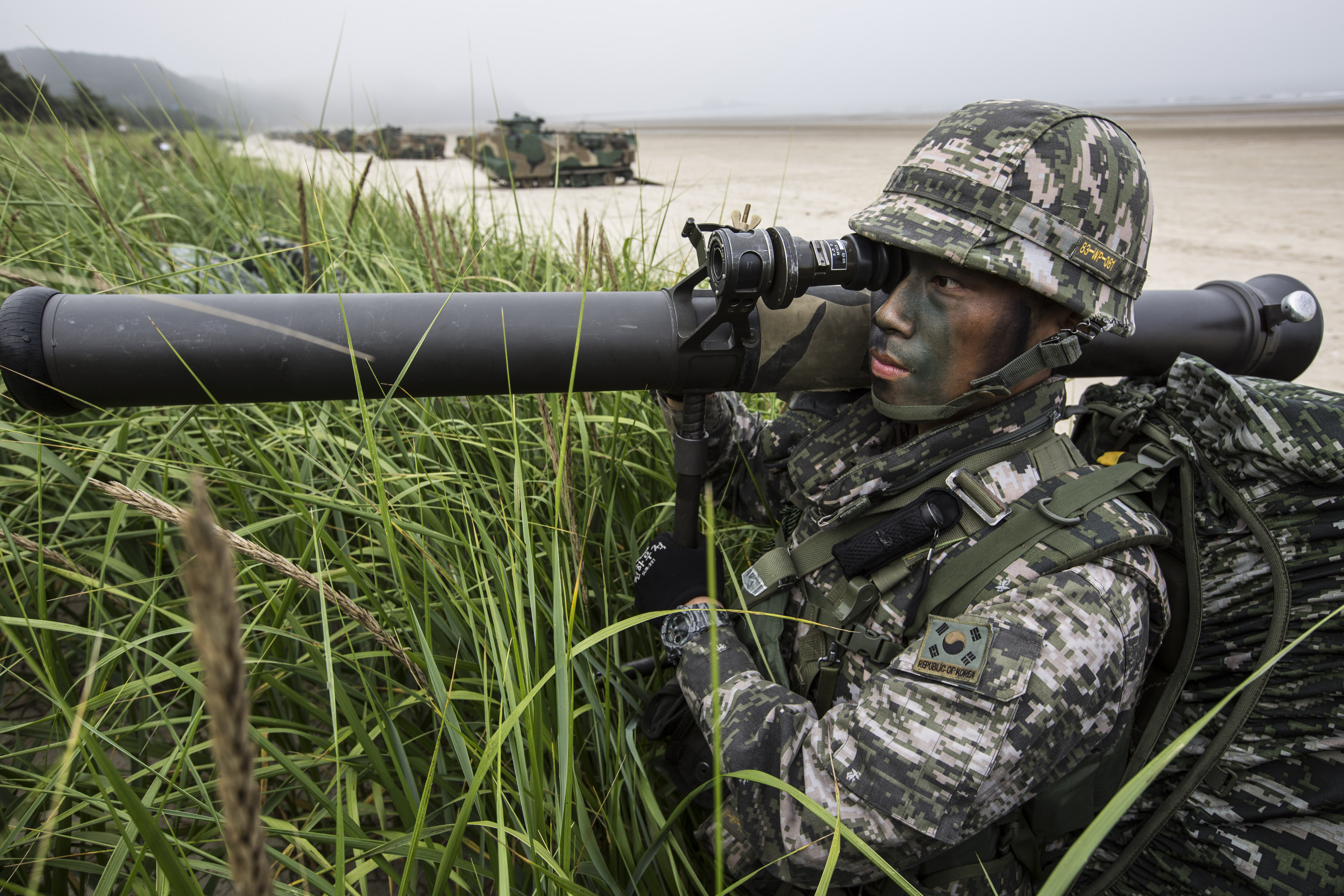
A South Korean marine with an M67 in 2015

=== Current ===
- El Salvador
- Philippines
- South Korea

=== Former ===
- Australia
- Greece
- Guatemala
- Honduras
- Mexico
- New Zealand
- Nicaragua
- Saudi Arabia
- South Vietnam
- United States

== See also ==
- M18 recoilless rifle

== References and notes ==
- (JIW) Hogg, Ian. Jane's Infantry Weapons 1984–85, London: Jane's Publishing Company Ltd., 1984.
