= Glossary of levelling terms =

This is a glossary of levelling terms. Levelling is a surveying method used to find relative height, one use of which is to ensure ground is level during construction, for example, when excavating to prepare for laying a foundation for a house.

== Levelling terms ==
- Automatic level – variant of the dumpy level, that makes use of a compensator that ensures that the line of sight remains horizontal once the operator has roughly leveled the instrument. The surveyor sets the instrument up quickly and doesn't have to relevel it carefully each time he sights on a rod on another point. It also reduces the effect of minor settling of the tripod. Three adjustment screws are used to level the instrument.

- Back sight (BS) – short for "back sight reading", the first staff reading taken by the surveyor after the levelling instrument is set up and levelled. B.S is generally taken on the point of known reduced level as on the benchmark or a change point.
- Benchmark (surveying) – fixed reference point of known elevation with respect to which RL of other points is determined. Benchmarks can be arbitrary or permanent, the former is used for calculation of reduced levels for small survey works and the latter is used to calculate the elevations of significantly important locations and points. Arbitrary benchmarks are assumed to be equal to 100 meters generally and then the elevations with respect to assumed benchmark is determined. It is commonly practiced by engineering students. For GTS surveys of the country, surveyors use permanent benchmarks to calculate the elevations of different points.
- Datum surface – reference plane with respect to which RL of the other survey points is determined. The datum surface may be real or imaginary location with a nominated elevation of zero. The commonly used datum is mean sea level.
- Dumpy level – optical instrument used to establish or check points in the same horizontal plane. It is used in surveying and building with a vertical staff to measure height differences and to transfer, measure and set heights. Also called a builder's level or leveling instrument.

- Fore sight (FS) – short for "fore sight reading", the last staff reading taken before changing the instrument to the other position. It is the staff reading taken on point whose RL is to determined. This sight is considered as negative and deduced from Height of Instrument to determine RL of the point.

- Intermediate sights – all readings taken between back sight and fore sight. These are the points whose RL is determined by the method already mentioned above in FS. Also called inter-sight readings.
- Laser level – control tool consisting of a laser beam projector that can be affixed to a tripod, and which projects a fixed red or green beam along the horizontal and/or vertical axis. A rotary laser level is a more advanced laser level in that it spins the beam of light fast enough to give the effect of a complete 360 degree horizontal or vertical plane, thus illuminating not just a fixed line, but a horizontal plane.
- Levelling – measurement of geodetic height using an optical levelling instrument and a level staff or rod having a numbered scale. Common levelling instruments include the spirit level, the dumpy level, the digital level, and the laser level.
- Levelling staff – specialized measuring stick or vertical staff used with the dumpy level, held by a second person while the operator of the level looks through it and takes readings off of the staff. Also call a rod.
- Reduced level (RL) – equating elevations of survey points with reference to a common assumed datum. The elevation is positive or negative according as point lies above or below datum.
- Spirit level – instrument designed to indicate whether a surface is horizontal (level) or vertical (plumb). While used by surveyors, different types of spirit levels may be used by carpenters, stonemasons, bricklayers, other building trades workers, millwrights and other metalworkers, and in some photographic or videographic work.

== See also ==
- Surveying
- Prismatic compass (surveying)
