= Stadia mark =

Rangefinding crosshairs in a surveying instrument

Stadia marks, also called stadia lines or stadia hairs, are crosshairs on the reticle of a theodolite or other surveying instrument that allow stadiametric rangefinding.

== Etymology ==
The term stadia mark derives from the obsolete unit of distance, the stadion, derived from the Greek measurement of a stadium. Several different stadia were defined, such as the Greek stadion and Egyptian stadion.

== Usage ==
Stadia marks on a crosshair while viewing a metric levelling rod. The top mark is at 1.500 m and the lower is at 1.345 m. The difference between the rod readings is 0.155 m, yielding a distance to the rod of 15.5 m.

A typical surveyor's instrument reticle has two pairs of stadia marks. One pair are on the horizontal centreline and the other on the vertical cross hair. Each functions in the same manner and are placed for measuring on either axis.

k = f/i
k = D/s

where

- D is distance from the telescope to the rod
- k is the stadia interval factor
- S is the stadia intercept
- f is focal length of the lens
- i is the spacing between the stadia marks

The stadia marks are set a specific length apart. This length is chosen so that there is a fixed, integer ratio between the difference of the rod readings and the distance from the telescope to the rod. Thus the formula for distance is

D = kS + C

where

- D is distance from the telescope to the rod
- k is the stadia interval factor
- S is the stadia intercept
- C is the stadia constant

For example, a typical stadia mark pair are set so that the ratio is 100. If one observes a vertical length on a stadia rod, rule or levelling rod with the telescope and sees that the rod spans 0.500 m between the marks (the stadia interval), then the horizontal distance from the instrument to the rod is:

0.500m x 100 = 50 m.

In the adjacent image, the upper stadia mark is at 1.500 m and the lower at 1.345 m. The difference is 0.155 m. Thus the distance from the instrument to the levelling rod is:

0.155 x 100 = 15.5 m.

The stadia interval factor is the ratio of the focal length of the lens and the distance or spacing between the stadia hairs. Depending on the spacing between the stadia marks, the value remains constant for any given instrument. The most common stadia interval factor is 100. To determine the stadia interval factor, the stadia intercept must divide the distance from the main focus per sight. The values of k will not be the same, given they will be part of the errors in observation and natural sources. The formula for the stadia interval factor is:

== See also ==
- Stadiametric rangefinding
- Tacheometry
- Theodolite
- Dumpy level
- Plane table
- Levelling rod
