= Communicating vessels =

Set of internally connected containers containing a homogeneous fluid

A set of communicating vessels

Animation showing the filling of communicating vessels

Communicating vessels or communicating vases are a set of containers containing a homogeneous fluid and connected sufficiently far below the top of the liquid: when the liquid settles, it balances out to the same level in all of the containers regardless of the shape and volume of the containers. If additional liquid is added to one vessel, the liquid will again find a new equal level in all the connected vessels. This was discovered by Simon Stevin as a consequence of Stevin's Law. It occurs because gravity and pressure are constant in each vessel (hydrostatic pressure).

Blaise Pascal proved in the seventeenth century that the pressure exerted on a molecule of a liquid is transmitted in full and with the same intensity in all directions.

== Applications ==
Since the days of ancient Rome, the concept of communicating vessels has been used for indoor plumbing, via aquifers and lead pipes. Water will reach the same level in all parts of the system, which acts as communicating vessels, regardless of what the lowest point is of the pipes – although in practical terms the lowest point of the system depends on the ability of the plumbing to withstand the pressure of the liquid.

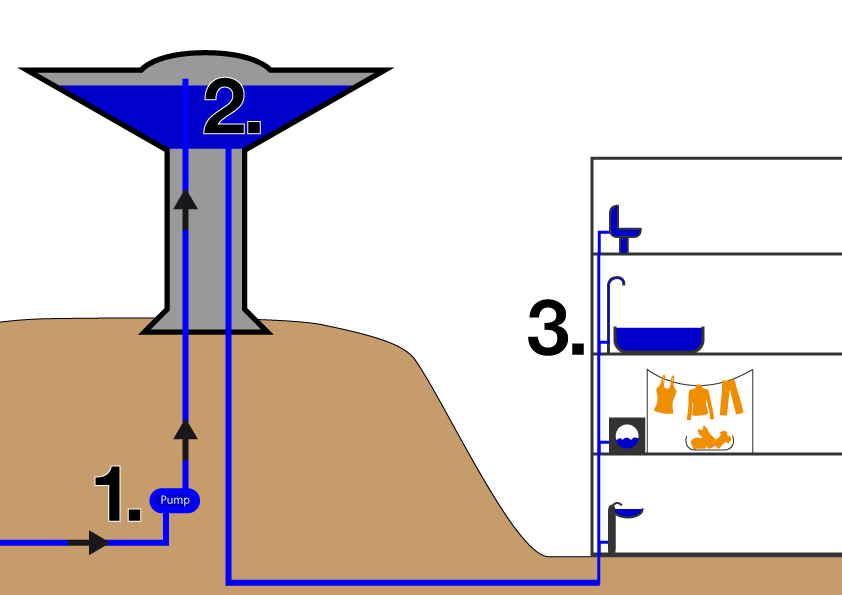
The surface of the water tower's water (2) is above that of the water pipes in all buildings (3)

In cities, water towers are frequently used so that city plumbing will function as communicating vessels, distributing water to higher floors of buildings with sufficient pressure.

Hydraulic presses, using systems of communicating vessels, are widely used in various applications of industrial processes.

== See also ==
- Artesian well
- Water level (device)
