= Pole (surveying) =

Surveyor's tool

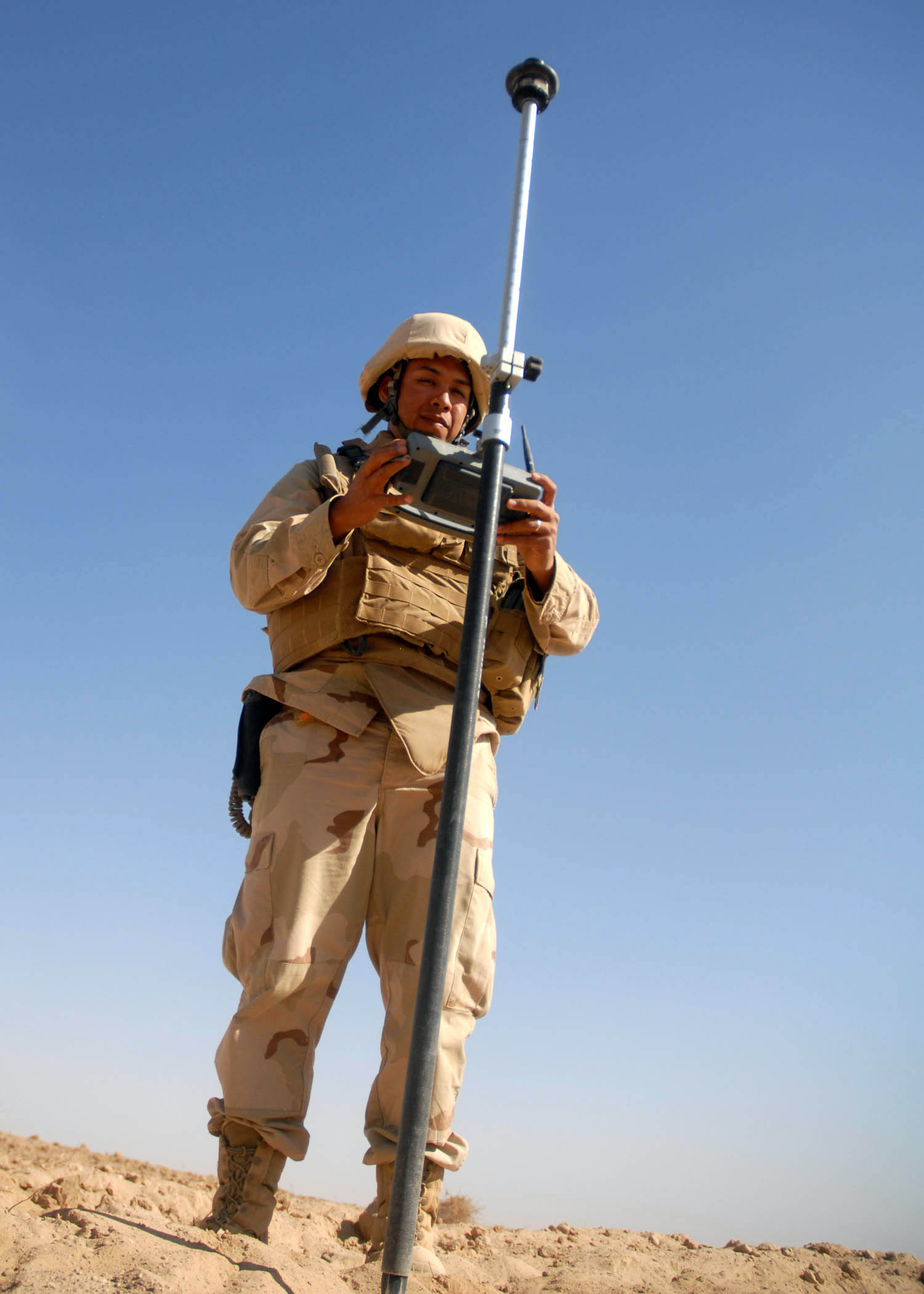
Surveying prism pole with instrument attached

In surveying, a pole or rod is bar made of wood or metal and normally held vertical, upon which different instruments can be mounted: a prism, a GPS device, etc. It may be manufactured with a predetermined length (e.g., 2 meters) or may be graduated for different heights or stages.

Technology advances have introduced tilt-compensation capability into survey poles, that allow the surveyor to measure points above ground or when the pole is off-vertical.

== See also ==
- Level staff
