= Water level (device) =

Device used for matching elevations

A water level device showing both ends at the same height

A water level (Greek: Aλφαδολάστιχο or (υδροστάθμη) [Alfadolasticho]) is a siphon utilizing two or more parts of the liquid water surface to establish a local horizontal line or plane of reference. It is used to determine the apparent inclination of an object or surface and for matching water level elevations at locations that are too far apart for a spirit level to span.

The simplest water level is a section of clear tubing, partially filled with water. Water is easily procured for use, and easily discarded after use. The ends are held vertical, and the rest of the tubing lies on the ground or floor. The water level at each end of the tube will be at the same elevation, whether the two ends are adjacent or far apart, so a line between them will be horizontal at its midpoint and a shed base, building foundation or similar structure laid out using several such lines will be "horizontal" within building tolerances on any scale over which use of a water level is practicable. Water levels have been used for many years. The water level is lower-tech than the laser level, but it can be more accurate over long distances, and works without a sightline, such as around corners. To avoid error, all of the water should be at the same temperature. Other sources of error include difficulty reading due to meniscus.

If the water level is used often, dye can be added to the water to make it easier to see. If the water level is used outdoors in winter, antifreeze can be added to the water. Automotive window washer fluid can also be used for antifreeze and increased visibility. Additionally it inhibits the formation of error-causing bubbles. A surfactant (surface active agent), such as hand-dishwashing liquid detergent, can be added to the water to significantly lower the surface tension of the water. This liquid solution will flow more easily and more rapidly in the tube than plain water, so operation of the device will be more precise, repeatable, and responsive – particularly when using a small-diameter tube. Also, this liquid solution can be emptied from a small-diameter tube more easily than plain water.

In geodesy and surveying, the use of a water level device extended over long distances (sometimes, kilometers) is termed hydrostatic levelling, after the principles of hydrostatic equilibrium and levelling.

== See also ==
- Communicating vessels
