= Level staff =

Graduated rod used to measure differences between heights

A level staff, also called levelling rod, is a graduated wooden or aluminium rod, used with a levelling instrument to determine the difference in height between points or heights of points above a vertical datum. When used for stadiametric rangefinding, the level staff is called a stadia rod.

== Rod construction and materials ==
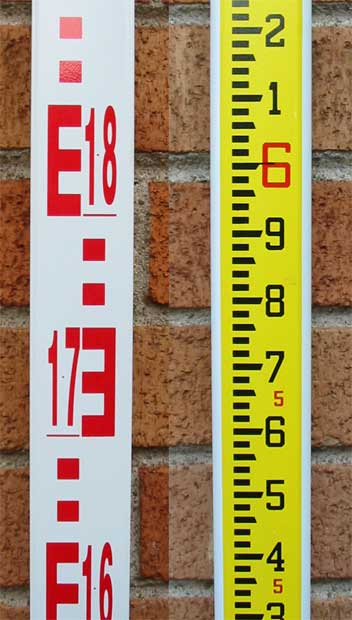
Two sides of a modern surveyor's levelling rod. Metric graduations are on the left, imperial on the right.

Levelling rods can be one piece, but many are sectional and can be shortened for storage and transport or lengthened for use. Aluminum rods may be shortened by telescoping sections inside each other, while wooden rod sections can be attached to each other with sliding connections or slip joints, or hinged to fold when not in use.

There are many types of rods, with names that identify the form of the graduations and other characteristics. Markings can be in imperial or metric units. Some rods are graduated on one side only while others are marked on both sides. If marked on both sides, the markings can be identical or can have imperial units on one side and metric on the other.

== Reading a rod ==
In the photograph on the right, both a metric (left) and imperial (right) levelling rod are seen. This is a two-sided aluminum rod, coated white with markings in contrasting colours. The imperial side has a bright yellow background.

The metric rod has major numbered graduations in meters and tenths of meters (e.g. 18 is 1.8 m - there is a tiny decimal point between the numbers). Between the major marks are either a pattern of squares and spaces in different colours or an E shape (or its mirror image) with horizontal components and spaces between of equal size. In both parts of the pattern, the squares, lines or spaces are precisely one centimetre high. When viewed through an instrument's telescope, the observer can visually interpolate a 1 cm mark to a tenth of its height, yielding a reading with precision in mm. Usually readings are recorded with millimetre precision. On this side of the rod, the colours of the markings alternate between red and black with each meter of length.

The imperial graduations are in feet (large red numbers), tenths of a foot (small black numbers) and hundredths of a foot (unnumbered marks or spaces between the marks). The tenths of a foot point is indicated by the top of the long mark with the upward sloped end. The point halfway between tenths of a foot marks is indicated by the bottom of a medium length black mark with a downward sloped end. Each mark or space is approximately 3mm, yielding roughly the same accuracy as the metric rod.

== Classes of rods ==
Surveyor's view of the levelling rod with the crosshair. This indicates a reading of 1.422 m, interpolated between the 1.420 m and 1.430 m marks.

Rods come in two classes:

1. Self-reading rods (sometimes called speaking rods).
2. Target rods.

Self-reading rods are rods that are read by the person viewing the rod through the telescope of the instrument. The graduations are sufficiently clear to read with good accuracy. Target rods, on the other hand, are equipped with a target. The target is a round or oval plate marked in quarters in contrasting colours such as red and white in opposite quarters. A hole in the centre allows the instrument user to see the rod's scale. The target is adjusted by the rodman according to the instructions from the instrument man. When the target is set to align with the crosshairs of the instrument, the rodman records the level value. The target may have a vernier to allow fractional increments of the graduation to be read.

Digital levels electronically read a bar-coded scale on the staff. These instruments usually include data recording capability. The automation removes the requirement for the operator to read a scale and write down the value, and so reduces blunders. It may also compute and apply refraction and curvature corrections.

== Topographer's rods ==
Topographer's rods are special purpose rods used in topographical surveys. The rod has the zero mark at mid-height and the graduations increase in both directions away from the mid-height.

In use, the rod is adjusted so that the zero point is level with the instrument (or the surveyor's eye if he is using a hand level for low-resolution work). When placed at any point where the level is to be read, the value seen is the height above or below the viewer's position.

An alternative topographer's rod has the graduations numbered upwards from the base.

== See also ==
- Measuring rod
- Philadelphia rod
- Pole (surveying)
- Ranging rod
- Retroreflector
- Stadia mark
- Staff (head) gauge
