= Level (optical instrument) =

Optical instrument to verify horizontal points

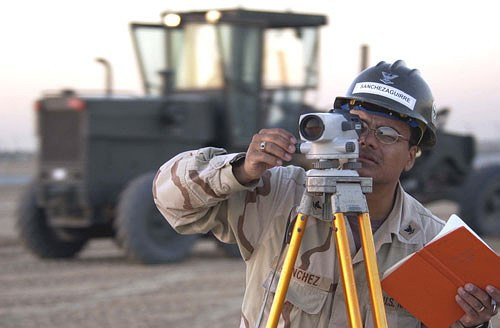
Modern automatic level in use on a construction site

A level is an optical instrument used to establish or verify points in the same horizontal plane in a process known as levelling. It is used in conjunction with a levelling staff to establish the relative height or levels (the vertical separation) of objects or marks. It is widely used in surveying and construction to measure height differences and to transfer, measure, and set heights of known objects or marks.

It is also known as a surveyor's level, builder's level, dumpy level or the historic "Y level". It operates on the principle of establishing a visual level relationship between two or more points, for which an inbuilt optical telescope and a highly accurate bubble level are used to achieve the necessary accuracy. Traditionally the instrument was completely adjusted manually to ensure a level line of sight, but modern automatic versions self-compensate for slight errors in the coarse levelling of the instrument, and are thereby quicker to use.

The optical level should not be confused with a theodolite, which can also measure angles in the vertical plane.

== Description ==
The complete unit is normally mounted on a tripod, and the telescope can freely rotate 360° in a horizontal plane. The surveyor adjusts the instrument's level by coarse adjustment of the tripod legs and fine adjustment using three precision levelling screws on the instrument to make the rotational plane horizontal. The surveyor does this with the use of a bull's eye level built into the instrument mount.

The surveyor looks through the eyepiece of the telescope while an assistant holds a vertical level staff which is graduated in inches or centimeters. The level staff is placed with its foot on the point for which the level measurement is required. The telescope is rotated and focused until the level staff is plainly visible in the crosshairs. In the case of a tilting level, the fine level adjustment is made by an altitude screw, using a high accuracy bubble level fixed to the telescope. This can be viewed by a mirror whilst adjusting, or the ends of the bubble in a "split bubble" display can be viewed within the telescope. This also allows assurance of the accurate level of the telescope whilst the sight is being taken. However, in the case of an automatic level, altitude adjustment is done automatically by a suspended prism due to gravity, as long as the coarse levelling of the instrument base is accurate within certain limits.

When level, the staff graduation readings at the crosshairs and stadia marks are recorded, and an identifying mark or marker placed where the level staff rested on the object or position being surveyed.

== Invention ==
In 1832, English civil engineer and inventor William Gravatt, who was commissioned to examine a scheme for the South Eastern Railway's route from London to Dover, became frustrated with the slow and cumbersome operation of the "Y" level during the survey work, and devised the more transportable, easier-to-use "dumpy" level, so called because of its shorter appearance.

The telescope of the historic "Y" level is held in two brass arms, which are part of the mount and the telescope could be easily removed to allow sighting reversal though 180 degrees or an axial rotation of the telescope; both to compensate for optical collimation errors. Because the telescope is not fixed to the level adjusting mechanism, the "Y" instrument is assembled and disassembled for each sighting station. However, the dumpy level is permanently secured to its two support arms and the levelling mechanism, thereby reducing measurement uncertainty and considerably reducing the time taken to set up the instrument. The dumpy uses the same basic principle of level sighting.

== Survey operation ==
After careful setup of the level, the height of the crosshairs is determined by either sighting from a known benchmark with known height determined by a previous survey or an arbitrary point with an assumed height is used.

Sighting is done with an assistant surveyor who holds a graduated staff vertical at the point under measurement. The surveyor rotates the telescope until the graduated staff is in the crosshairs and records the reading. This is repeated for all sightings from that datum. Should the instrument be moved to another position within sighting distance, it is re-levelled, and a sighting taken of a known level in the previous survey. This relates any new levels to the previous levels.

== Variants ==
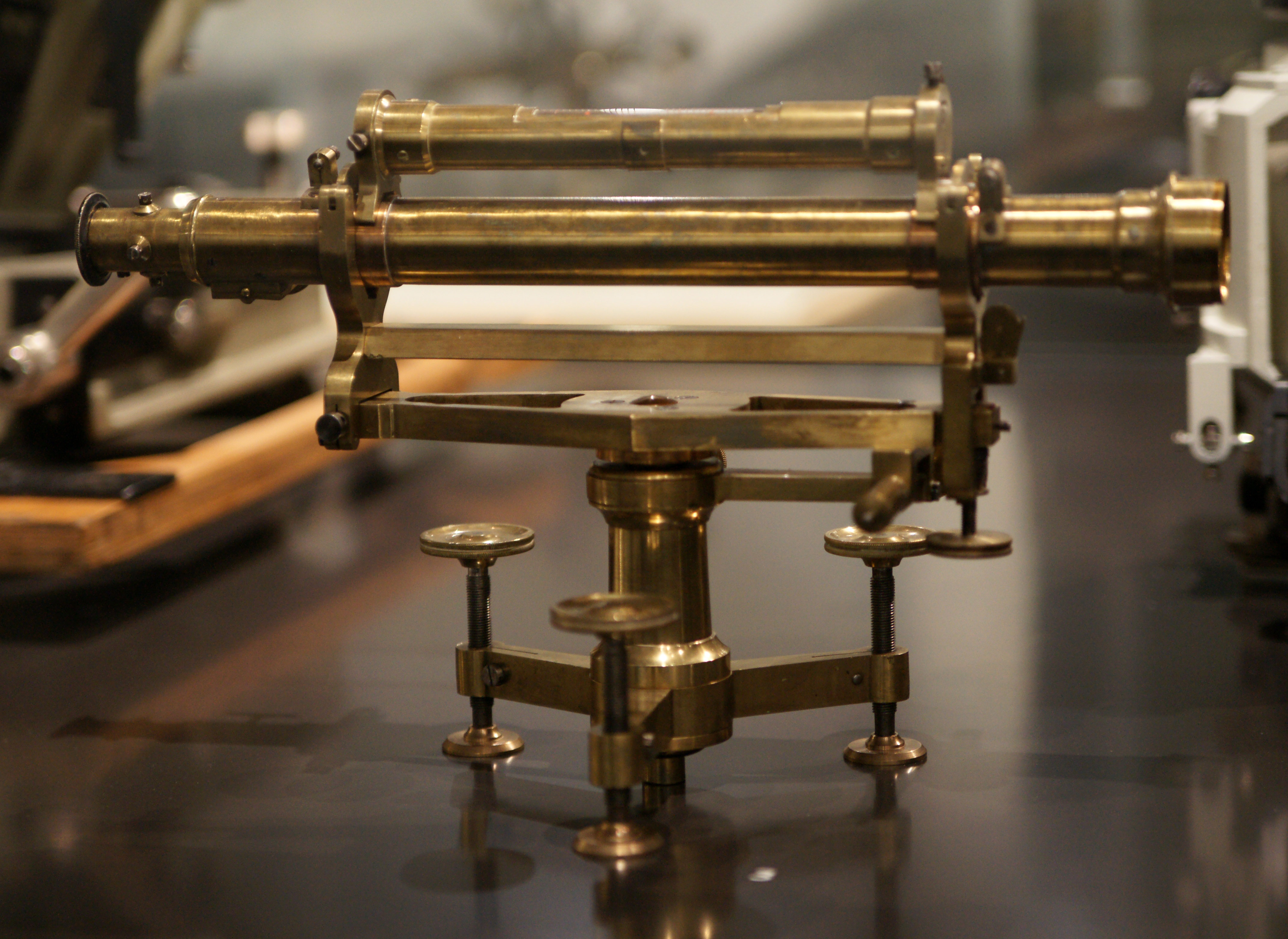
A "Y" level. The telescope can be removed and reversed or rotated to remove errors.

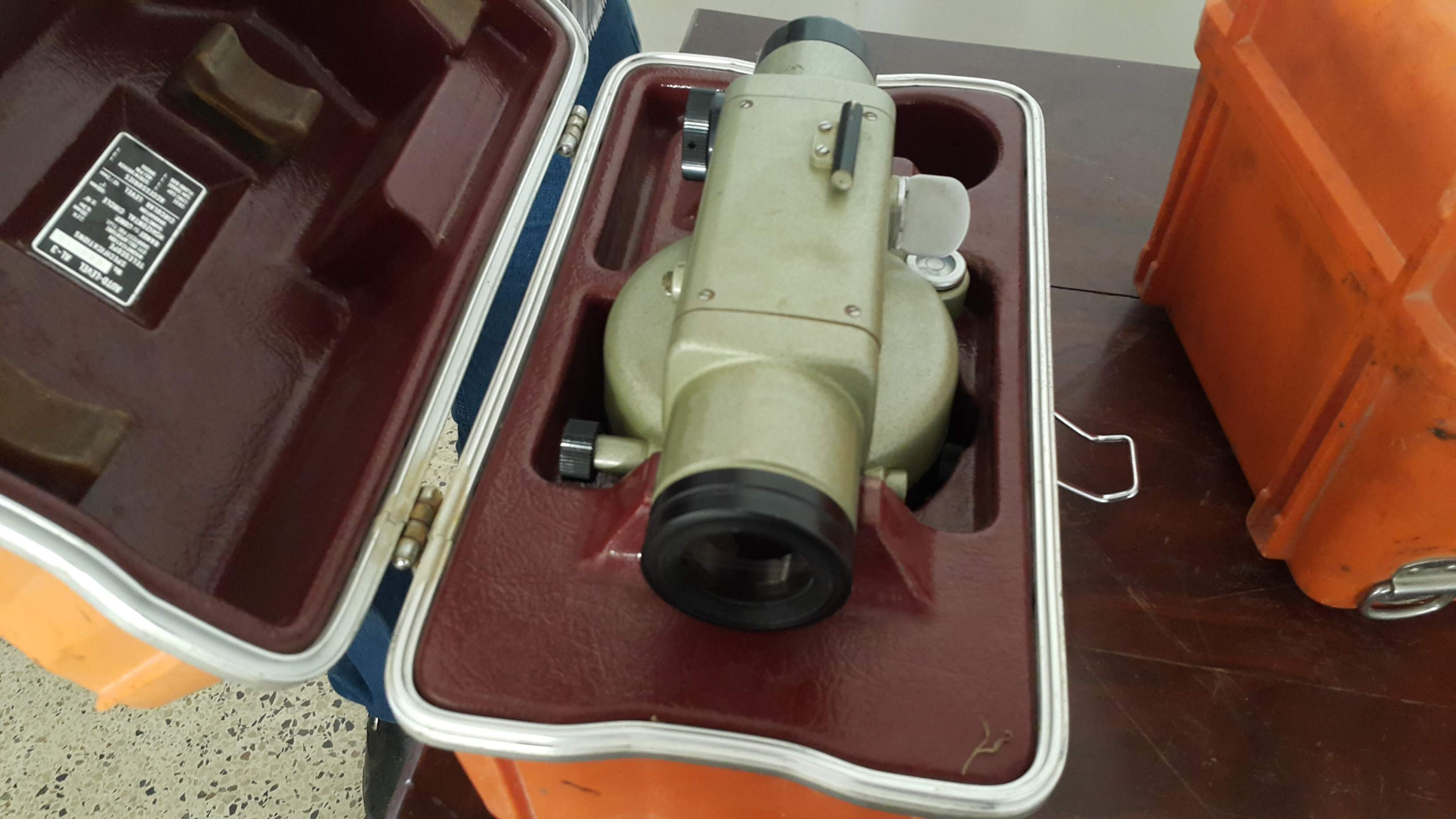
An autolevel

=== Y level ===
The Y level or wye level is the oldest and bulkiest of the older style optical instruments. A low-powered telescope is placed in a pair of clamp mounts, and the instrument then leveled using a spirit level, which is mounted parallel to the main telescope.

=== Dumpy level ===
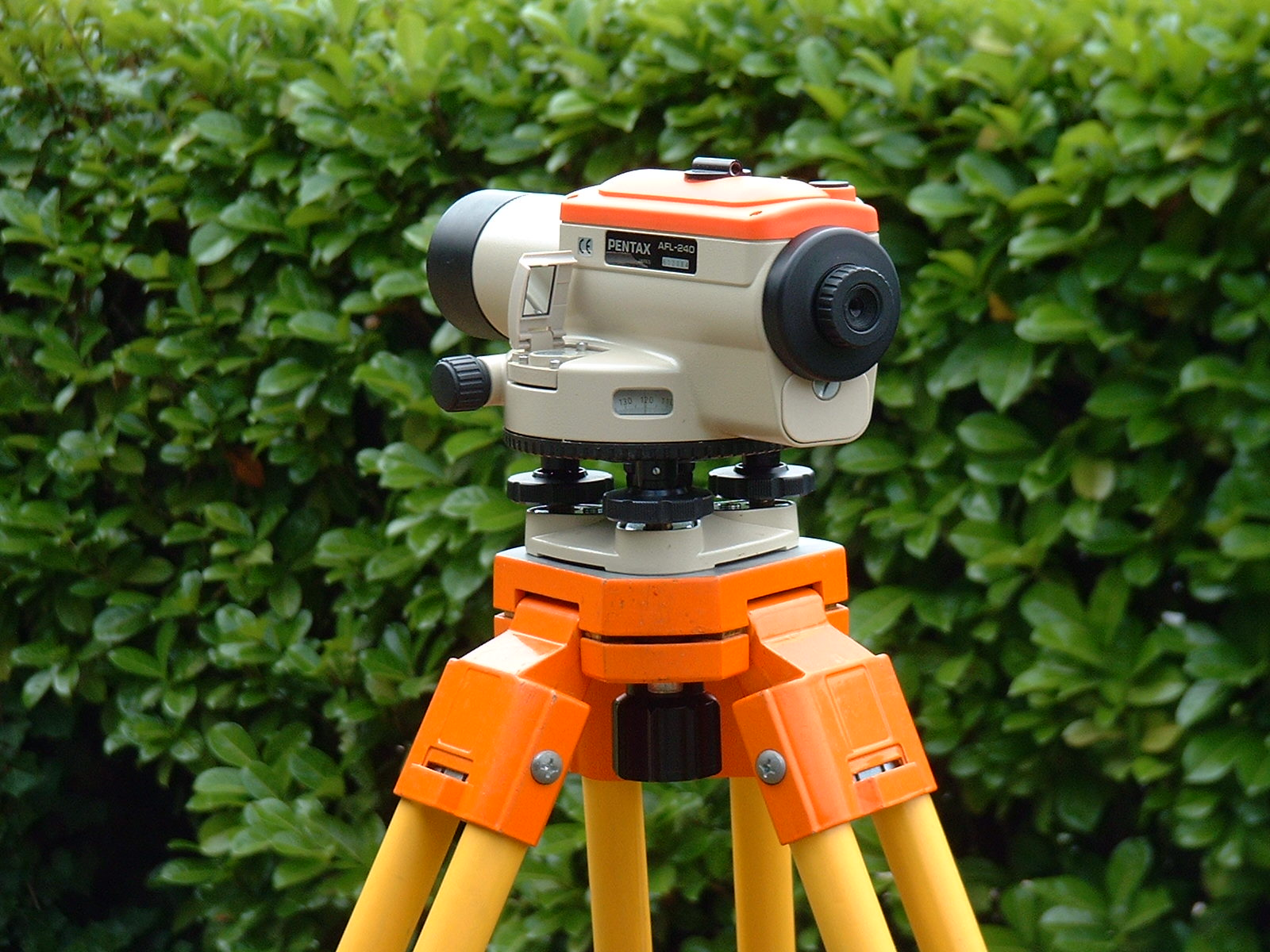
A modern automatic optical level with a horizontal transit readout.

The term dumpy level (also builder's level) endures despite the evolution in design. They can be manual or automatic, the latter being much quicker to set up.

=== Tilting level ===
A tilting level is a variant which has a precision vertical adjustment screw which tilts both the telescope and the high accuracy bubble level attached to it to make them level. This reduces the complete reliance on the levelling accuracy of the instruments' bottom mount, and the "split bubble" display gives additional assurance that the telescope is level whilst taking the sight. This allows faster operation as the bottom mount need not be truly level, though it will introduce a slight error as the vertical axis of the mount is not completely coincident with the telescope centre. The split bubble works by displaying half of both ends of the bubble side by side in the telescope, and when the curved ends are aligned it is level.

=== Automatic level ===
The internal prism mechanism of an automatically levelling telescope.

An automatic level, self-levelling level, or builder's auto level includes an internal compensator mechanism (a swinging prism) that, when set close to level, automatically removes any remaining variation. This reduces the need to set the instrument base truly level, as with a dumpy level. Self-levelling instruments are the preferred instrument on building sites, construction, and during surveying due to ease of use and rapid setup time. The world's first automatic level was introduced on 8 March 1950. It was produced by the German company Zeiss-Opton in Oberkochen. Main components of an automatic level include a tribrach – a lower, fixed, triangular or circular element containing three sockets for adjusting screws (or wedge rings), attached to the tripod with a heart screw – and an alidade – a movable (rotatable) part. In automatic levels, the spirit level is most often replaced by a pendulum-based opto-mechanical device called a compensator.

=== Digital electronic level ===
A digital electronic level is also set level on a tripod and reads a bar-coded staff using electronic laser methods. The height of the staff where the level beam crosses the staff is shown on a digital display. This type of level removes interpolation of graduation by a person, thus removing a source of error and increasing accuracy. During night time, the dumpy level is used in conjunction with an auto cross laser for accurate scale readings.

=== Transit level ===
A transit level also has the ability to measure both the altitude and azimuth of a target object with respect to a reference in the horizontal plane. The instrument is rotated to sight the target, and the vertical and horizontal angles are read off calibrated scales

== In popular culture ==
In the first chapter of Thomas Hardy's 1887 novel The Woodlanders, the narrator states, "He knew every subtle incline of the ten miles of ground between Abbot's Cernel and Sherton—the market town to which he journeyed—as accurately as any surveyor could have learnt it by a Dumpy level."

In the online game World of Warcraft, there is a quest in Wetlands given by Surveyor Thurdan to retrieve his lost dumpy level. He even comments on the name, saying, "I didn't name the bloody thing, alright? Go look it up!"

== See also ==
- Glossary of levelling terms
- Rotary laser level, laser levels used in surveying and construction
- Line laser level, laser levels used in carpentry and home improvement
- Theodolite
- Total station
- Philadelphia rod
- Water level (device)
