= Staff gauge =

Scale used to provide indication of liquid level

A staff gauge or head gauge is calibrated scale which is used to provide a visual indication of liquid level. When installed perpendicular to an inclined or sloped surface, a staff gauge is usually calibrated so that the indicated level is the true vertical level.

Staff gauges are commonly installed at stream gauging stations to indicate the water stage or water level. They are also used to indicate the level (and hence flow rate) in open channel primary devices (flumes or weirs); see discharge (hydrology).

== See also ==
- Head (hydrology)
- Level staff
