= Williams Fire =

2002 wildfire in Southern California

- Part of the 2002 California wildfires
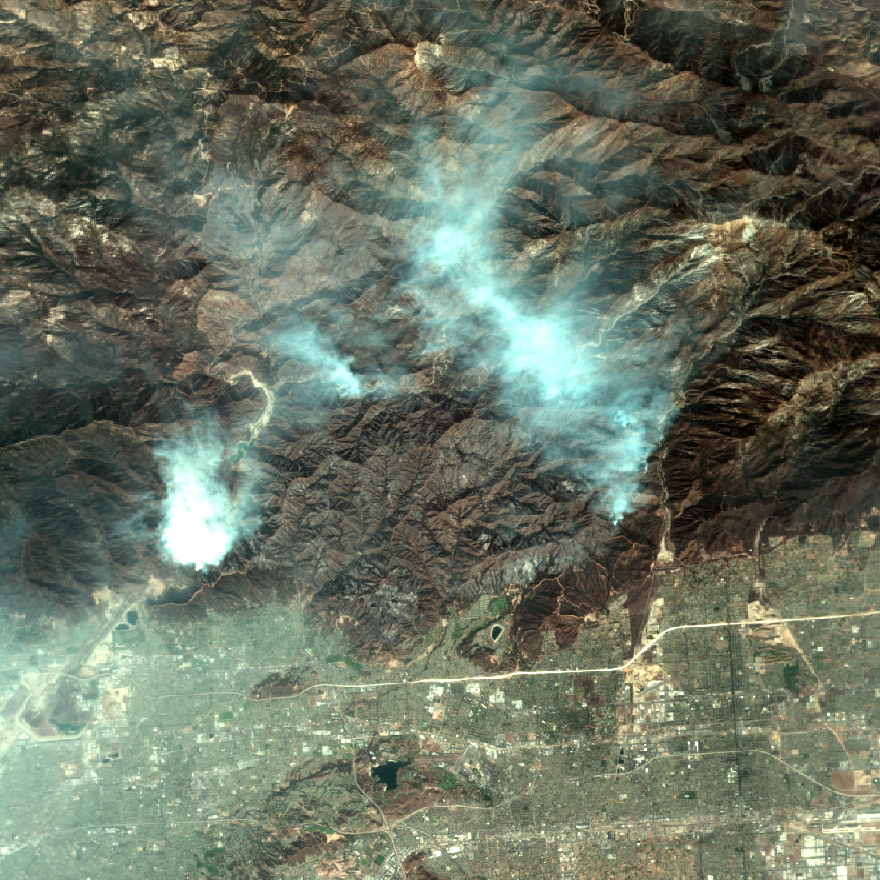
- The Williams Fire viewed from a NASA aircraft on September 26
- Date: September 22 –; October 1, 2002; (10 days)
- Location: Los Angeles County, Southern California, United States

Statistics
- Burned area: 38,094 acres (15,416 ha; 60 sq mi; 154 km^{2})

Impacts
- Injuries: ≥7
- Evacuated: >2,000
- Structures destroyed: 76
- Cost: $15 million; (equivalent to about $24.9 million in 2024)

Map
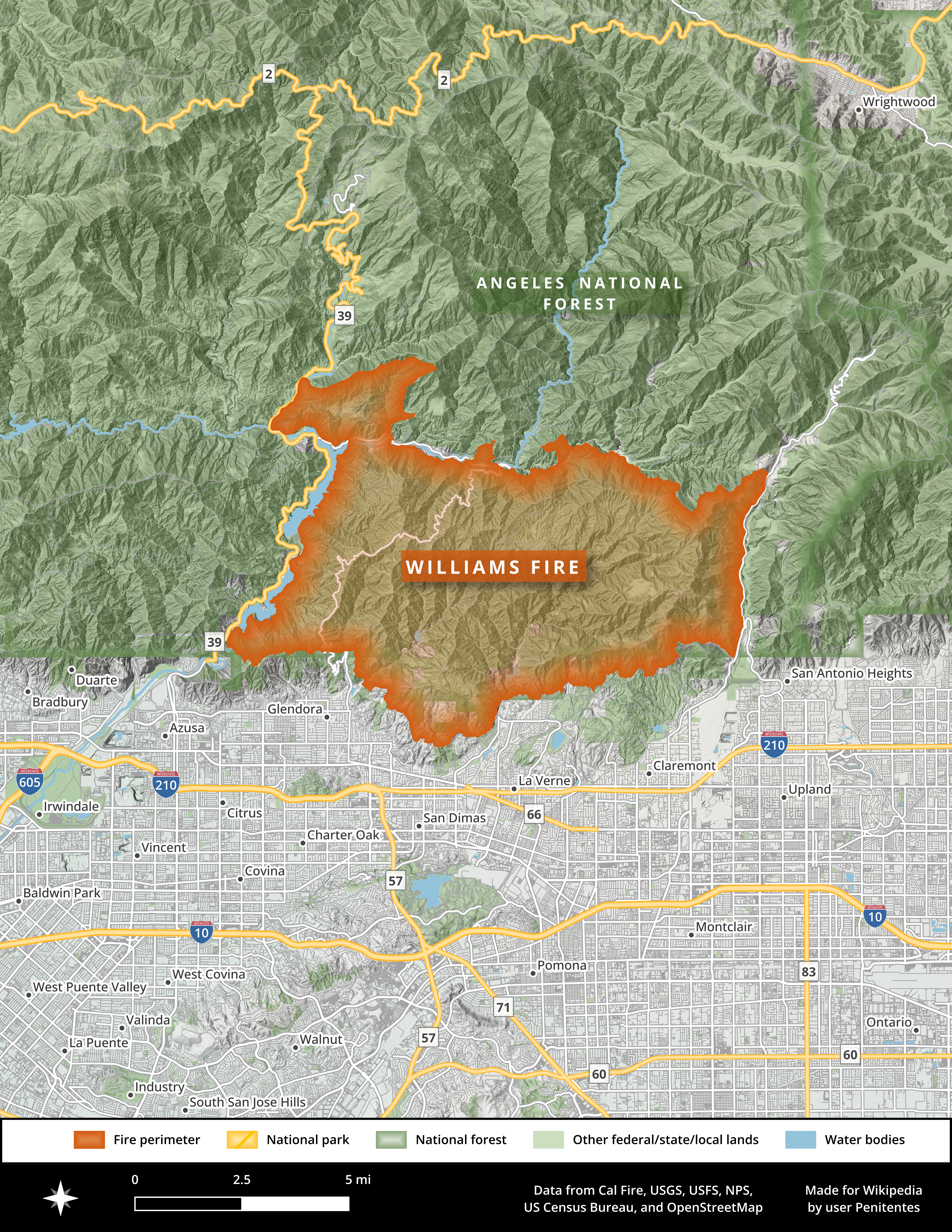
- The footprint of the Williams Fire

The 2002 Williams Fire was a large wildfire in Los Angeles County, California. After igniting on September 22, the fire burned 38,094 acres (15,416 hectares) before it was declared fully contained on October 1. The Williams Fire destroyed dozens of structures, largely cabins in the Angeles National Forest. It was the third largest wildfire of the 2002 California wildfire season, during which 8,171 individual fires burned a total of 538,216 acres (217,808 ha).

== Progression ==
The Williams Fire began on Sunday, September 22, 2002, at about 5:00 p.m. near Camp Williams in the Angeles National Forest north of Glendora. A gold prospector living in the area reported the fire by radio to the volunteer fire department at Camp Follows. The fire burned at least 750 acres (300 ha) by evening, forcing thousands of recreational visitors to evacuate the area.

By the night of September 23 the Williams Fire had burned 5,000 acres (2,000 ha) and was only 10 percent contained. A thousand firefighters fought the fire, aided by eight helicopters and nine air tankers, as it threatened neighborhoods in the community of La Verne.

By September 25 the fire's burned area amounted to more than 9,000 acres (3,600 ha). The brunt of the fire suppression effort was focused on the Williams Fire's 11-mile (18 km) southern flank, which threatened neighborhoods not just in La Verne but also in Azusa, Glendora, and San Dimas. The number of firefighters and aircraft assigned to the fire increased to roughly 2,000 and 30, respectively. The fire reached the top of Sunset Ridge on the night of the 25th, leading to evacuation orders for Mount Baldy Village. Firefighters successfully protected Julius Klein Conservation Camp, Camp Follows, and Camp Williams by setting backfires. By 6:00 p.m. on Wednesday, September 25, the fire had burned 30,000 acres (12,000 ha) and was 10 percent contained. The fire had closed to within one-half mile (0.80 km) of Palmer Canyon and within two miles (3.2 km) of Mount Baldy Village.

On Thursday, September 26, foggy conditions prevailed over the San Gabriel foothills, reducing the risk to communities there. At the higher elevations the fire remained active, closing to within 1.5 miles (2.4 km) of Mount Baldy Village. Firefighters worked to reduce the risk to the village by clearing brush from the side of Mount Baldy Road, laying twenty thousand feet (6,100 m) of hose line throughout the village, and coating the ridges surrounding the town with fire retardant. Late on the 26th the fire had burned 32,000 acres (13,000 ha) and was 35 percent contained.

By Friday, September 27, officials called the threat to property "significantly diminished" as an upper-level low-pressure system moved inland from the Pacific, bringing enough moisture to produce drizzle over the fire area. By then the Williams Fire had spread to more than 35,000 acres (14,000 ha) had burned and was 35 percent contained. By September 29—with the fire's activity largely quashed by weather systems—it had burned a total of 36,160 acres (14,630 ha) and was 80 percent contained. About 2,000 firefighters continued to construct fire lines.

The evacuation order for Mount Baldy was lifted the night of September 30. The Williams Fire was declared fully contained on October 1, 2002, with a total associated fire suppression cost of $15 million (split between the federal, state, and Los Angeles/San Bernardino county governments). It burned 38,094 acres (15,416 hectares) in total. The Williams Fire burn scar later helped limit the westward spread of the 2003 Grand Prix Fire.

== Cause ==
Authorities eliminated campfires or barbecues as potential sources for the fire's ignition. Campers at Camp Williams witnessed lightning strikes on the north side of Williams Canyon approximately 1 hour before being evacuated.

== Effects ==
The Williams Fire caused no fatalities. Seven people were injured, at least six of them firefighters.

The fire destroyed 76 structures, including 62 homes or cabins and 14 outbuildings. The majority of the lost homes were in San Dimas Canyon and had been leases from the Angeles National Forest. The fire also burned 85 percent of the San Dimas Experimental Forest, destroying a shed that stored soil samples dating back to the 1930s.

The number of people under evacuation exceeded 2,000, most of them residents of Mount Baldy, Palmer Canyon, and Padua Hills. The fire caused the Forest Service to close the entirety of the Angeles National Forest, a measure that had not been taken in over 25 years.

The South Coast Air Quality Management District issued an advisory for communities in the foothills of the San Gabriel and San Bernardino Mountains on September 25, urging residents to limit time spent outside.

== See also ==
- Glossary of wildfire terms
- List of California wildfires
- Curve Fire
- Bobcat Fire
- Bridge Fire
