= Wolf Fire =

Wolf Fire may refer to:

- Wolf Fire (2002), large wildfire in Southern California's Ventura County, north of the city of Ojai
- Wolf Fire (2025), wildfire in Riverside county in Southern California
