= Flood stage =

Water level in hydrology

Flood stage is the water level or stage at which the surface of a body of water has risen to a sufficient level to cause sufficient inundation of areas that are not normally covered by water, causing an inconvenience or a threat to life and property. When a body of water rises to this level, it is considered a flood event.

Flood stage does not apply to areal flooding. As areal flooding occurs, by definition, over areas not normally covered by water, the presence of any water at all constitutes a flood. Usually, moderate and major stages are not defined for areal floodplains.

== Definition ==
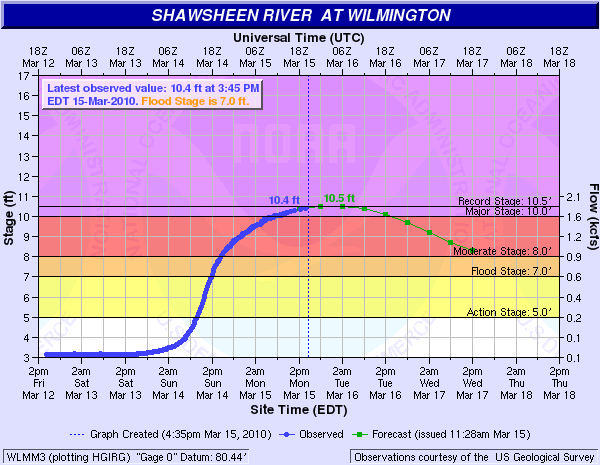
Example graph of stream stages showing Action Stage, Flood Stage, Moderate Stage, Major Stage, and Record Stage on a river.

Flood stage is the water level, as read by a stream gauge or tide gauge, for a body of water at a particular location, measured from the level at which a body of water threatens lives, property, commerce, or travel. The term "at flood stage" is commonly used to describe the point at which this occurs. "Gauge height" (also referred to as "stream stage", "stage of the [body of water]", or simply "stage") is the level of the water surface above an established zero datum at a given location. The zero level can be arbitrary, but it is usually close to the bottom of the stream or river or at the average level of standing bodies of water. Stage was traditionally measured visually using a staff gauge, which is a fixed ruler marked in 1/100 and 1/10 foot intervals, however electronic sensors that transmit real-time information to the Internet are now used for many of these kinds of measurements. The flood stage measurements are given as a height above or below the zero level. Levels below zero are reported as a negative value.

While usually the flood stage is set at the elevation of the floodplain, it can be higher (if there are no structures, roads, or farming areas immediately on the floodplain) or lower (if there are structures such as marinas, lake houses, or docks low on the banks or shores of the body of water) depending on the location. Because flood stage is defined by impacts to people, as opposed to the natural topography of the area, flood stages are usually only calculated for bodies of water near communities.

The flood stage can be listed for an entire community, in which case it is often set to the lowest man-made structure or road in the area, the lowest farming field in the area, or the floodplain. It can also be set for a specific location ("flood stage is 12 feet on Maple Street at First Avenue" means that the specified intersection will begin to flood when the stage reaches 12 feet (3.7 m)).

In the United States during flood events, the National Weather Service will issue flood warnings that list the current and predicted stages for affected communities as well as the local flood stage. Current stage data is collected by the USGS using a network of gauges, over 9000 of which transmit real time data via satellite, radio, or telephone. Many communities have inundation maps that provide information on which areas will flood at which stages.

== Flood categories ==
In the United States, there are five levels of flooding.

=== Action Stage ===
- Rivers: typically at this level, the water surface is generally near or slightly above the top of its banks, but no man-made structures are flooded; typically any water overflowing is limited to small areas of parkland or marshland.
- Coastlines: at action stage, usually elevated tides and minor inundation of low-lying beach areas occurs.

=== Minor Flood Stage ===
- Rivers: minor flooding is expected at this level, slightly above flood stage. Few, if any, buildings are expected to be inundated, however, roads may be covered with water, parklands, and lawns may be inundated and water may go under buildings on stilts or higher elevations.
- Coastlines: water will usually run all the way up to the dune in waves during a minor flood. Overwash may occur on shoreline roads. Lifeguard structures and beach concession stands will usually be flooded and may be damaged by surf.

=== Moderate Flood Stage ===
- Rivers: inundation of buildings usually begins at this stage. Roads are likely to be closed and some areas cut off. Some evacuations may be necessary.
- Coastlines: at moderate flood stage, usually water overtops the natural dune and begins flooding coastal areas. Shoreline roadways and beaches will often be completely flooded out. High surf usually associated with this level of flooding may pound some oceanside structures like piers, boardwalks, docks, and lifeguard stations apart. Beach houses may be damaged by water and surf, especially if lacking stilts.

=== Major Flood Stage ===
- Rivers: significant to catastrophic, life-threatening flooding is usually expected at this stage. Extensive flooding with some low-lying areas completely inundated is likely. Structures may be completely submerged. Large-scale evacuations may be necessary.
- Coastlines: Water surges over not only the dune, but also man-made walls and roads. Large and destructive waves pound weak structures and severely damage well-built homes and businesses. Overwash occurs on high-level seawalls. If major flooding occurs at high tide, impacts may be felt well inland. If cities are at or below sea level, catastrophic flooding can inundate the entire city and cause millions or billions of dollars in damage (as occurred in New Orleans during Hurricane Katrina).

=== Record Flood Stage ===
- Rivers: at this level, the river is at its highest that it has been since records began for the area where the stream gauge is located. This does not necessarily imply a major flood. Some areas may have never experienced major flooding, and thus record stage is in the moderate category.
- Coastlines: Usually, record flooding at the coast is associated with tropical cyclones, but it may be associated with coastal storms, Nor'easters, seiches caused by earthquakes, strong thunderstorms, or tsunamis. Destruction is often extensive and may extend a far distance inland.
