= Head (hydrology) =

Hydrological term

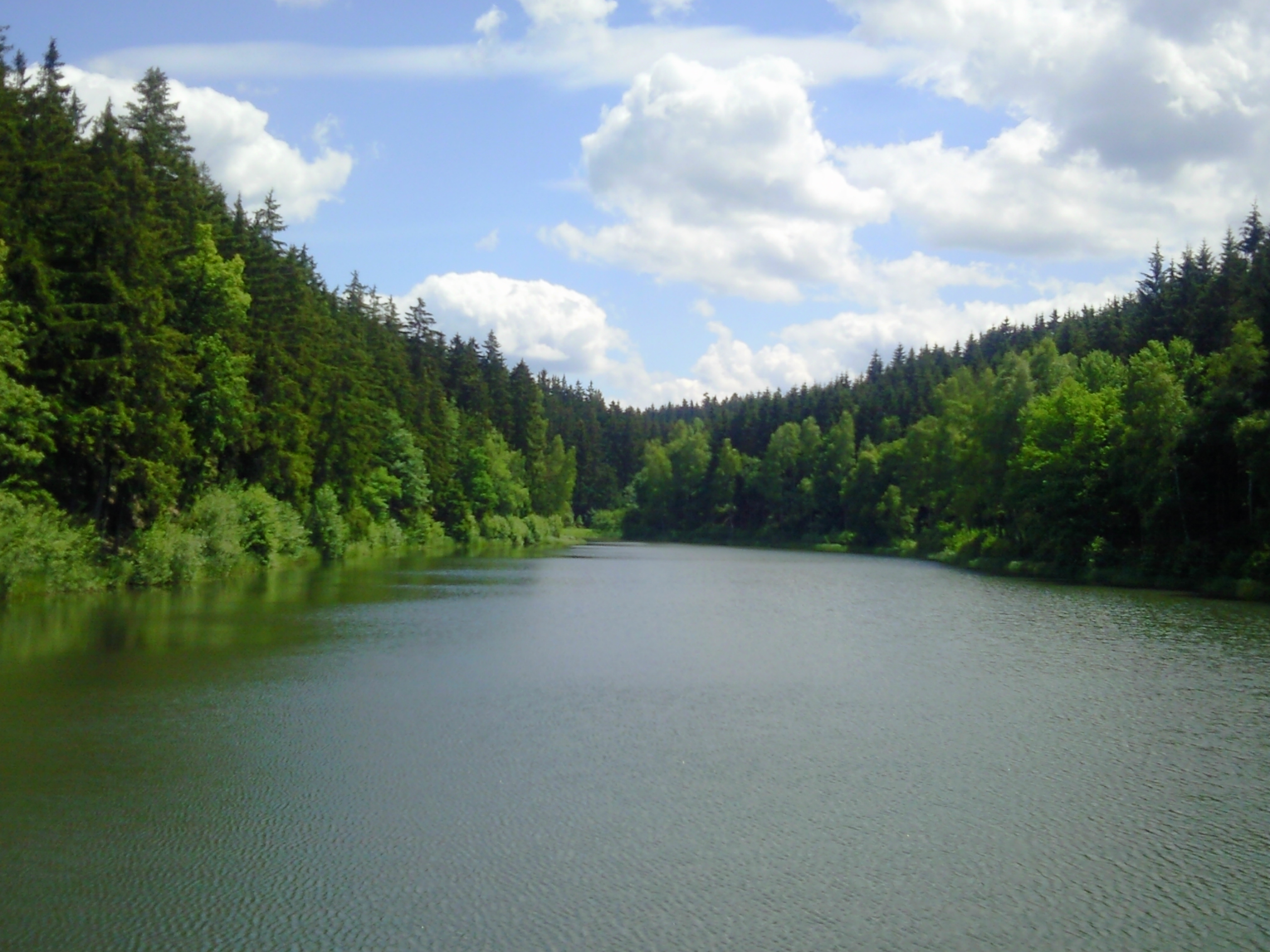
View looking towards the head of the Fürstenteich reservoir

In hydrology, the head is the point on a watercourse up to which it has been artificially broadened and/or raised by an impoundment. Above the head of the reservoir natural conditions prevail. Under it the water level above the riverbed has been raised by the impoundment and its flow rate reduced, unless and until banks, barrages, weir sluices or dams are overcome (overtopped), whereby a less frictional than natural course will exist (mid-level and surface instead of bed and bank currents) resulting in flash flooding below.

In principle, a distinction must be drawn between the head of a reservoir impounded by a dam, and the head of a works resulting from a barrage or canal locks.

== Head of a reservoir ==
A head's location varies with the height of the water level against the dam. Since there is only an extremely low flow within the reservoir so no water level gradient, the head can be clearly seen where the furthest watercourse discharges into the reservoir.

Upstream of the actual reservoir is likely to be a pre-dam, which typically have a constant water level so the head is reinforced.

The term does not apply to embankment (storage/settling) reservoirs, to which water is pumped from below.

== Head of a works ==
On large rivers in all but arid climates, the head of a works is rarely fixed rigidly, as, within the impounded reach a significant flow rate and water gradient is sometimes seen. The head can only be found by calculation or defined by observations with and without impoundment. Depending on the flow rate and control of the barrage, locks or weir, position will greatly vary and will not necessarily be where the so-called headworks are.

Many rivers (such as the Moselle) are barraged numerous times to make them navigable and/or to avoid uncontrolled flooding. In such a case, only the higher stretches of river are uninfluenced by impoundment. As to the other stretches the river has long "level" pounds, but no or few natural heads, instead having artificial structures until the top head. Ideal management of the higher heads will allow headroom to keep back some flood meadow water so as not to compound heavy precipitation and resultant run-off downstream. Corollary channels with spare capacity are a further mitigation where land is at a premium (such as the Jubilee River). Ideal management of the lowest head will allow daily timed openings, at least in flood events, to coincide with an outgoing (ebb), rather than flood tide.

== See also ==
- Hydraulic head
- Staff (head) gauge
