= Stage (hydrology) =

Water level in a river above a reference height

In hydrology, stage is the water level in a river or stream with respect to a chosen reference height. It is commonly measured in units of feet. Stage is important because direct measurements of river discharge are very difficult while water surface elevation measurements are comparatively easy. In order to convert stage into discharge, a rating curve is needed. Hydrologists can use a combination of tracer studies, observations of high water marks, numerical modeling, and/or satellite or aerial photography.

== See also ==
- Chart datum
- Hydraulic head
- Stream gauge
