= Wolf Fire (2002) =

2002 wildfire in Southern California

- Part of the 2002 California wildfires
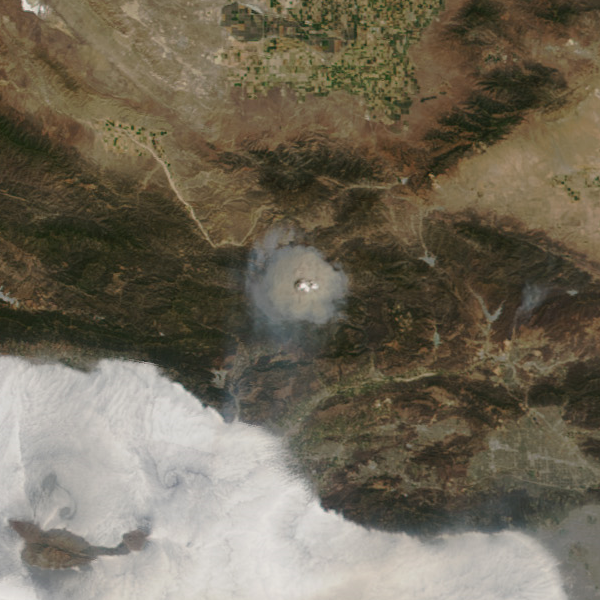
- The Wolf Fire's smoke plume, taken by NASA's Terra satellite on June 6, 2002
- Date: June 1 –; June 14, 2002; (14 days)
- Location: Ventura County, Southern California, United States
- Coordinates: 34.609°N 119.365°W

Statistics
- Burned area: 21,645 acres (8,759 ha; 34 sq mi; 88 km^{2})

Impacts
- Injuries: 4
- Structures destroyed: 6
- Cost: $15 million; (equivalent to about $25 million in 2024)

Ignition
- Cause: Firearms

Map
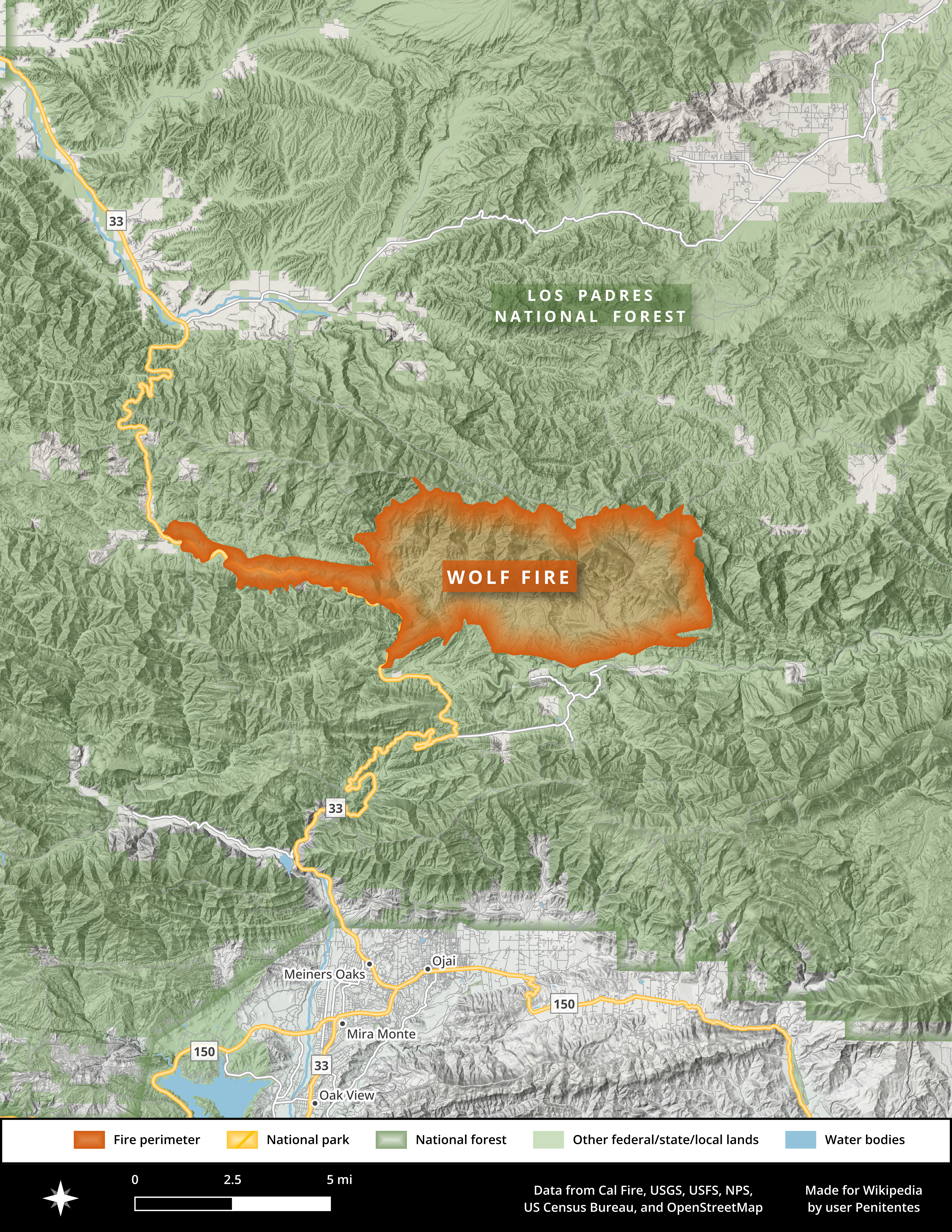
- The footprint of the Wolf Fire in the Los Padres National Forest north of Ojai, California

- The general location of the Wolf Fire in Ventura County, California

The Wolf Fire was a large wildfire in Southern California's Ventura County, north of Ojai, in June 2002. The fire, ignited by target shooting in dry grass, began on June 1 and burned 21,645 acres (8,759 hectares) before it was completely contained on June 14. Containment cost $15 million (equivalent to $25 million in 2024). No deaths or serious injuries occurred, but the fire impacted parts of the Sespe Wilderness and the Los Padres National Forest, closing roads and campgrounds while threatening Native American cultural sites and wildlife habitat. The Wolf Fire was the sixth largest fire of the 2002 California wildfire season, during which 8,171 wildfires burned more than half a million acres (200,000 ha).

== Background ==
In the winter and spring leading up to the Wolf Fire, Southern California received very little rain, marking its fourth year of below-normal precipitation. Vegetation dryness approached record levels, and firefighters remarked on the surprising vigor of even small grass fires in the spring. It made for one of the earliest fire seasons in decades; fire officials declared the beginning of fire season in mid-April in much of Southern California, including Ventura County, a month ahead of schedule. By June, vegetation in Southern California was as dry as it typically would be in September. Fire danger in the Los Padres National Forest was also heightened by a lack of prescribed burning to thin out vegetation: a shortfall in congressional funding meant that only 5,000 acres (2,000 ha) of the hoped-for annual 20,000 to 25,000 acres (8,100 to 10,100 ha) were treated with prescribed fire in 2002.

== Cause ==
The Wolf Fire began shortly before 3:00 p.m. PDT on June 1, approximately 100 feet (30 m) from the Wolf Grill restaurant, an establishment located on California State Route 33 12 miles (19 km) north of Ojai in the Los Padres National Forest. U.S. Forest Service investigators later determined that the fire was ignited unintentionally by people shooting at an abandoned van in dry grass and brush. No suspects were identified, nor were any arrests made.

== Progression ==
As soon as the fire broke out next to the Wolf Grill, its patrons attempted to call the authorities, but there was no cellular service in the area. A motorcyclist left and alerted fire crews at a Forest Service fire station twenty minutes' drive north, but the crews did not arrive at the fire until forty minutes after it had ignited.

The fire, originating in the main stem of the Sespe Creek drainage and benefiting from warm, dry, and breezy conditions, entered dense chaparral vegetation in rugged terrain and grew quickly. Despite the efforts of seven aircraft (both air tankers and helicopters) and ground crews, what had been roughly a 30-acre (12 ha) fire at 4:00 p.m. covered 200 acres (81 ha) by 5:00 p.m. and 450 acres (180 ha) by 9:00 p.m. As it grew, the fire jumped across Highway 33 and forced officials to close the route between Rose Valley and Pine Mountain Summit. No evacuation orders were issued.

The route remained closed on Sunday, June 2, as the Wolf Fire moved east along Highway 33 between Pine Mountain and Chorro Grande Canyon. Embers carried the fire across the highway again at 11:00 a.m. As the fire progressed, it destroyed three abandoned buildings formerly used for horseback camping. By the end of the day, the fire had burned approximately 2,500 acres (1,000 ha) and five percent of the perimeter was contained. A spokesman cautioned that the fire had "extreme" potential for growth—the last large wildfire in the region had been the >200,000-acre (81,000 ha) Matilija Fire in 1932, which informed fire crews' projections.

Firefighters did not think they could contain the fire to the Chorro Grande Canyon with their available resources, but they still hoped to keep it out of the Matilija Wilderness and the Sespe Wilderness to the south and east respectively. They were unsuccessful—on Monday, June 3, the fire entered the Sespe Wilderness. Winds from the southeast and northeast encouraged spot fires. An 18-mile (29 km) portion of Highway 33 remained closed between Rose Valley and Lockwood Valley. Firefighters maintained a defensive stance, noting that they could not get in front of the fire even as they planned to keep it within a 'box' bounded by Cherry Creek and Pipeline Road to the west, Dry Lakes Ridge and Rose Valley Road to the south, Sycamore Creek to the east, and Pine Mountain Ridge to the north.

On Tuesday, June 4, the fire expanded to about 7,500 acres (3,000 ha), with its perimeter 15 percent contained, after burning north through the Derrydale Creek drainage. Firefighters struggled through temperatures of 90 °F and a relative humidity of under ten percent, which in combination with the dry vegetation led to flame heights of 100 to 300 feet (30 to 91 m).

The incident management team (IMT) assigned to the Wolf Fire (in this case, California IMT 4) established a main camp in Soule Park in Ojai itself, supplied with bathroom facilities, a kitchen, and tents, from which to manage the multi-agency fire suppression effort. From there, many firefighters were flown in to the remote flanks of the fire, and others made do by hiking in several miles on foot. Many personnel worked shifts of more than 30 hours in hot, windy weather. The GIS and mapping unit went through 300 to 400 feet (91 to 122 m) of paper per day. Fire officials told the Ventura County Board of Supervisors to expect the fire to burn for another week, and the director of Cal Fire said that the Wolf Fire was low on the priority list for firefighting resources, given the lack of a significant threat to life and private property. At the peak of the fire more than two dozen aircraft—both fixed-wing and helicopters—were used to drop water and fire retardant.

On Wednesday, June 5, the fire burned northeast towards and then along Pine Mountain Ridge. As the fire neared the Sespe Condor Sanctuary, special permission was granted for bulldozers to operate in the Sespe Wilderness, where such heavy machinery is normally prohibited by federal regulations. Firefighters used the opportunity to construct a six-to-ten-mile (9.7 to 16.1 km) containment line on the southern end of the wilderness area. By the end of the day the Wolf Fire had burned more than 10,000 acres (4,000 ha) and remained 15 percent contained. Then, overnight, the fire grew rapidly to the east. It traveled about six miles (9.7 km) through the Sespe Wilderness, roughly doubling in size to just shy of 20,000 acres (8,100 ha). This made it the second largest active wildfire in the state, just behind the nearby Copper Fire in Los Angeles County.

On Thursday, June 6, the fire continued to grow aggressively to the northeast via long-range ember spotting, while crews focused on containment lines for the fire's northwestern and southern flanks.

Beginning on Friday, June 7, the weather became less conducive to fire growth: the higher temperatures and winds abated, and moisture from the nearby marine layer made its way to the Wolf Fire. The fire's forward progression slowed, and by sunset fire officials were calling the fire 25 percent contained. Air tankers continued to drop water and fire retardant, flying out of Lancaster and Goleta. Between June 8 and June 9 the fire grew by only 55 acres (22 ha). Firefighters succeeded in keeping the fire south of Pine Mountain Ridge and north of Sespe Creek, minimizing the threat to more developed areas. Four hundred firefighters rappelled in to an inaccessible part of the fire on the northern slope of Pine Mountain Ridge, spending multiple days completing containment lines there with hand tools. One battalion chief with the San Bernardino National Forest opined that if the weather had not changed, the Wolf Fire could have burned to Interstate 5 to the east.

Late on Monday, June 11, the fire had burned approximately 21,300 acres (8,600 ha) and was 60 percent contained. Hundreds of firefighters were released from their assignments as the number of personnel dwindled from 2,000 to about 1,100. Containment increased to 85 percent on June 12, then 90 percent on June 13. The last portion of open fire line was at the fire's northeastern corner near Thorn Point. The Wolf Fire was declared fully contained at 6:00 p.m. on Friday, June 14. Three helicopters were retained to monitor the fire over the weekend in case of any re-ignition. The cost of containing the fire amounted to about $15 million, roughly equivalent to $25 million in 2024.

The Wolf Fire's 21,645-acre (8,759-hectare) burned area made it the sixth largest of the 2002 California wildfire season, during which 8,171 wildfires burned a total of 538,216 acres (217,808 ha). The burn scar later acted as a barrier to the spread of the 162,702-acre (65,843 ha) Day Fire in 2006.

== Effects ==
Four firefighters were injured. Three suffered from heat exhaustion and/or dehydration, two of whom were taken to the hospital on June 4. Firefighters also discovered a body in a remote area on June 12, towards the end of fire containment operations, but it was confirmed as that of a suicide victim from three years prior.

The Wolf Fire destroyed six structures, four of them unoccupied ranch buildings and two of them outbuildings for a vacation home. The Wolf Grill restaurant itself was not damaged in the fire.

The entire Sespe Wilderness was closed, as were multiple campgrounds, including those in the Pine Mountain and Rose Valley regions. Four hikers who might have been in the fire's path, were rescued by the Ventura County Sheriff's Department on the morning of June 7. Highway 33 re-opened on June 6. Large portions of the Los Padres National Forest closure order were rescinded on July 5, re-opening all national forest lands north of Sespe Creek to Pine Mountain Ridge, and west of Highway 33/Burro Creek to Trout Creek.

=== Cultural resource impact ===
The Wolf Fire threatened more than 200 petroglyphs or pictographs, as well as other artifacts, created by the Chumash native people. Forest Service archeologists conducted multi-week surveys in the month following the fire, assessing the damage and the vulnerability to looting at known archaeological sites as well as ones newly revealed by the fire. The chief archeologist for the Los Padres National Forest told the Los Angeles Times that at least some "ancient rock art [which included] depictions of day-to-day life among the Chumash" had been damaged by smoke or soot.

In the October following the fire, Public Employees for Environmental Responsibility (PEER), a national watchdog nonprofit organization, published a white paper written by "former cultural resources staff and volunteers" with the Los Padres National Forest. The PEER report alleged that "the fire and bulldozed fire lines severely damaged known prehistoric sites", including the Piedra Blanca rock art site, and that fire personnel and archaeologists had not taken adequate care to avoid damaging sites during firebreak construction or forestall fire/smoke damage to the sites by installing protective measures. The allegations were part of a wider denouncement of Los Padres National Forest leadership, and received coverage in the Los Angeles Times. A state and federal interagency team reviewed the PEER report's allegations the following spring and wrote in a report of their own that the allegations—including those regarding the Wolf Fire—were without merit.

=== Environmental impact ===
The forest coordinator for the Los Padres National Forest referred to the deleterious effects of the Wolf Fire on the environment as "minimal" and noted the natural role that wildfires play in regenerating the landscape. The Burned Area Emergency Rehabilitation (BAER) team assigned to the fire found little risk of dangerous flooding or debris flows in the Sespe Creek watershed, barring extraordinarily heavy rainfall. Nonetheless the BAER team and fire crews performed erosion mitigation work, repaired/installed rain and stream gauges, and restored containment lines.

Forest Service biologists were concerned about the fire's impacts on habitat for the arroyo toad and southern steelhead trout populations, as well as damage to the Condor Sanctuary. The Wolf Fire burned 12 percent of the entire Sespe Creek watershed. The fire was severe enough to kill most of the trees in upland chamise-manzanita stands as well as adjacent white alder-coast live oak stands in the Piedra Blanca Creek drainage.

The fire burned at a high enough elevation that smoke did not reach local communities, though ash from the fire drifted southeast and to the coast and the Simi Valley.

== Growth and containment ==
Fire containment status Gray: contained; Red: active; %: percent contained;
Date	Area burned in acres (ha)	Personnel	Containment
June 1	450 acres (182 ha)	...	
June 2	2,500 acres (1,012 ha)	914 personnel	
June 3	5,930 acres (2,400 ha)	1,153 personnel	
June 4	7,476 acres (3,025 ha)	1,234 personnel	
June 5	10,644 acres (4,307 ha)	1,670 personnel	
June 6	19,788 acres (8,008 ha)	...	
June 7	20,795 acres (8,415 ha)	1,753 personnel	
June 8	20,795 acres (8,415 ha)	...	
June 9	20,850 acres (8,438 ha)	>1,500 personnel	
June 10	21,278 acres (8,611 ha)	...	
June 11	21,278 acres (8,611 ha)	1,100 personnel	
June 12	21,278 acres (8,611 ha)	>1,200 personnel	
June 13	21,645 acres (8,759 ha)	...	
June 14	21,645 acres (8,759 ha)	300 personnel	

== See also ==
- Glossary of wildfire terms
- List of California wildfires
