= Willow Beach Gauging Station =

- U.S. National Register of Historic Places
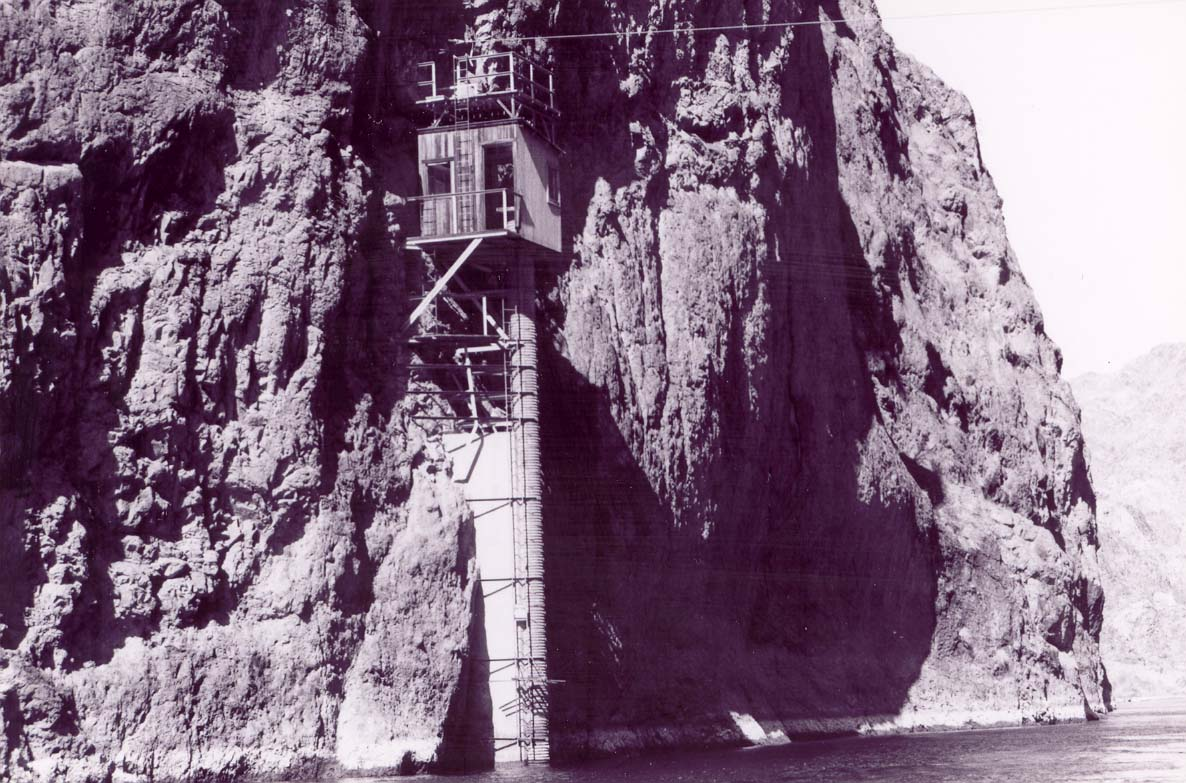
- Willow Beach Gauging Station

- Location within Nevada Location within the United States
- Nearest city: Boulder City, Nevada
- Coordinates: 35°53′17″N 114°40′57″W
- Built: 1934
- Architect: U.S. Geological Survey; Baumgartner, J.A.
- NRHP reference No.: 86000587
- Added to NRHP: March 21, 1986

Willow Beach Gauging Station is a gauging station located within Lake Mead National Recreation Area. The Willow Beach Gauging Station was listed in the National Register of Historic Places on March 21, 1986.

The cables, catwalk, trail and gauging station that are listed in the register are located on the Colorado River north of Willow Beach between Lake Mead and Lake Mohave. The gauging station was built in 1931 to measure the flow downstream from Hoover Dam.

The station is on the Nevada side of the river. Access is from the river or from a tramway on the Arizona side of the river.

== See also ==
- Embudo Stream Gauging Station
