= Rating curve =

In hydrology, a rating curve is a graph of discharge versus stage for a given point on a stream, usually at gauging stations, where the stream discharge is measured across the stream channel with a flow meter. Numerous measurements of stream discharge are made over a range of stream stages. The rating curve is usually plotted as discharge on x-axis versus stage (surface elevation) on y-axis.

The development of a rating curve involves two steps. In the first step the relationship between stage and discharge is established by measuring the stage and corresponding discharge in the river. And in the second part, stage of river is measured and discharge is calculated by using the relationship established in the first part. Stage is measured by reading a gauge installed in the river. If the stage-discharge relationship does not change with time, it is called permanent control. If the relationship does change, it is called shifting control. Shifting control is usually due to erosion or deposition of sediment at the stage measurement site. Bedrock-bottomed parts of rivers or concrete/metal weirs or structures are often, though not always, permanent controls.

If G represents stage and Q represents discharge, then the relationship between G and Q can possibly be approximated with an equation:

$$Q = C_r (G-a)^\beta$$

where $C_r$ and $\beta$ are rating curve constants, and $a$ is a constant which represents the gauge reading corresponding to zero discharge. The constant $a$ can be measured when a stream is flowing under "section control" as the surveyed gauge height of the lowest point of the section control feature. When a stream is flowing under "channel control" conditions, the parameter $a$ does not have a physical analogue and must be estimated by following standard methods given in literature. The parameter $\beta$ is typically in the range of 2.0 to 3.0 when a stream is flowing under section control, and in the range of 1.0 to 2.0 when a stream is flowing under channel control.

A stream will typically transition from section control at lower gauge heights to channel control at higher gauge heights. The transition from section control to channel control can often be inferred by a change in the slope of a rating curve when plotted on log-log graph paper.
