= Frederick Haynes Newell =

American hydraulic engineer (1862–1932)

- Newell, c. 1900
- Born: March 5, 1862; Bradford, Pennsylvania
- Died: July 5, 1932 (aged 70); Washington, D.C.
- Resting place: Needham Cemetery
- Education: Massachusetts Institute of Technology
- Spouse: Effie Josephine Mackintosh
- Parent(s): Augustus William Newell and Anna M. Haynes
- Engineering career
- Discipline: Irrigation engineering
- Institutions: United States Reclamation Service
- Employer: United States Geological Survey
- Projects: Inland Waterways Commission
- Awards: Cullum Geographical Medal

Frederick Haynes Newell (March 5, 1862 – July 5, 1932) served as the first Director of the United States Reclamation Service. Born in Bradford, Pennsylvania, he graduated in 1885 from the Massachusetts Institute of Technology and after field experience in Colorado and other states was appointed on October 2, 1888, as Assistant Hydraulic Engineer of the United States Geological Survey, being the first aide designated under Major John Wesley Powell to investigate the extent to which the arid regions of the United States might be reclaimed by irrigation. He was subsequently appointed Chief of the Hydrographic Branch.

At the same time, he actively assisted Representative Francis G. Newlands (later Senator) of Nevada, George H. Maxwell of California, President of the National Irrigation Association, and others in the preparation and public presentation of various Congressional bills, one of which by the personal efforts of President Theodore Roosevelt became the Reclamation Act when signed by the latter on June 17, 1902. Immediately after that date Mr. Newell was appointed Chief Engineer under Charles D. Walcott, then Director of the U. S. Geological Survey. In 1907 Roosevelt appointed him as a member of the Inland Waterways Commission.

== Early life ==
Newell was born on March 5, 1862, in Bradford, Pennsylvania, a small lumber and mining town to father, Augustus William Newell, and mother, Anna M. Haynes. His father was an early industrialist and real estate mogul in Bradford. Newell's mother and Newell's sibling died in child birth a year after Newell was born. Newell would spend his childhood and teenage years with extended relatives, living with his uncle in Newton, Connecticut prior to attending MIT.

== Early career ==
After receiving his BA in Mining Engineering, Newell returned to Bradford to work for his father. Frederick described his father as "always sanguine, full of entrancing schemes...He was surveyor, engineer and general all around man . . . . He bought and sold coal and timber lands and went into various ventures, characteristic of the time and place. Newell recalled in his unpublished memoirs "The people [in Bradford] were what might be called typical mountaineers and laborers in the lumber camps, rough, illiterate and with many queer old country habits and superstitions." Afterwards, he joined the Ohio Geological Survey in order to study oil–bearing rocks, but in 1888 Newell met John Wesley Powell, the head of the United States Geological Survey in Boston.

== U.S. Geological Survey ==
In 1888 Powell created the Irrigation Survey. One of the functions of the Irrigation Survey was to undertake a systematic program of measuring streamflow in rivers across the western United States in order to determine how much land could be irrigated in each river basin. Newell was hired to develop the methods to be used to accomplish this and to train engineers to carry it out. This was done at a camp on the banks of the Rio Grande River at Embudo, New Mexico in the winter of 1888–9. This is the site of the Embudo Stream Gauging Station. It is now regarded as the birthplace of systematic streamgaging in the United States. Starting in the Spring of 1889 the hydrographers trained at Embudo fanned out to establish streamgages all across the Western US. Newell lead these efforts and created the convention of using the spelling "gage" (still in use in the Geological Survey as of 2022) rather than "gauge".

"The pioneer work he performed in those early years in the Geological Survey has led to his having often been referred to as the 'father of systematic stream gaging' in [the US]"

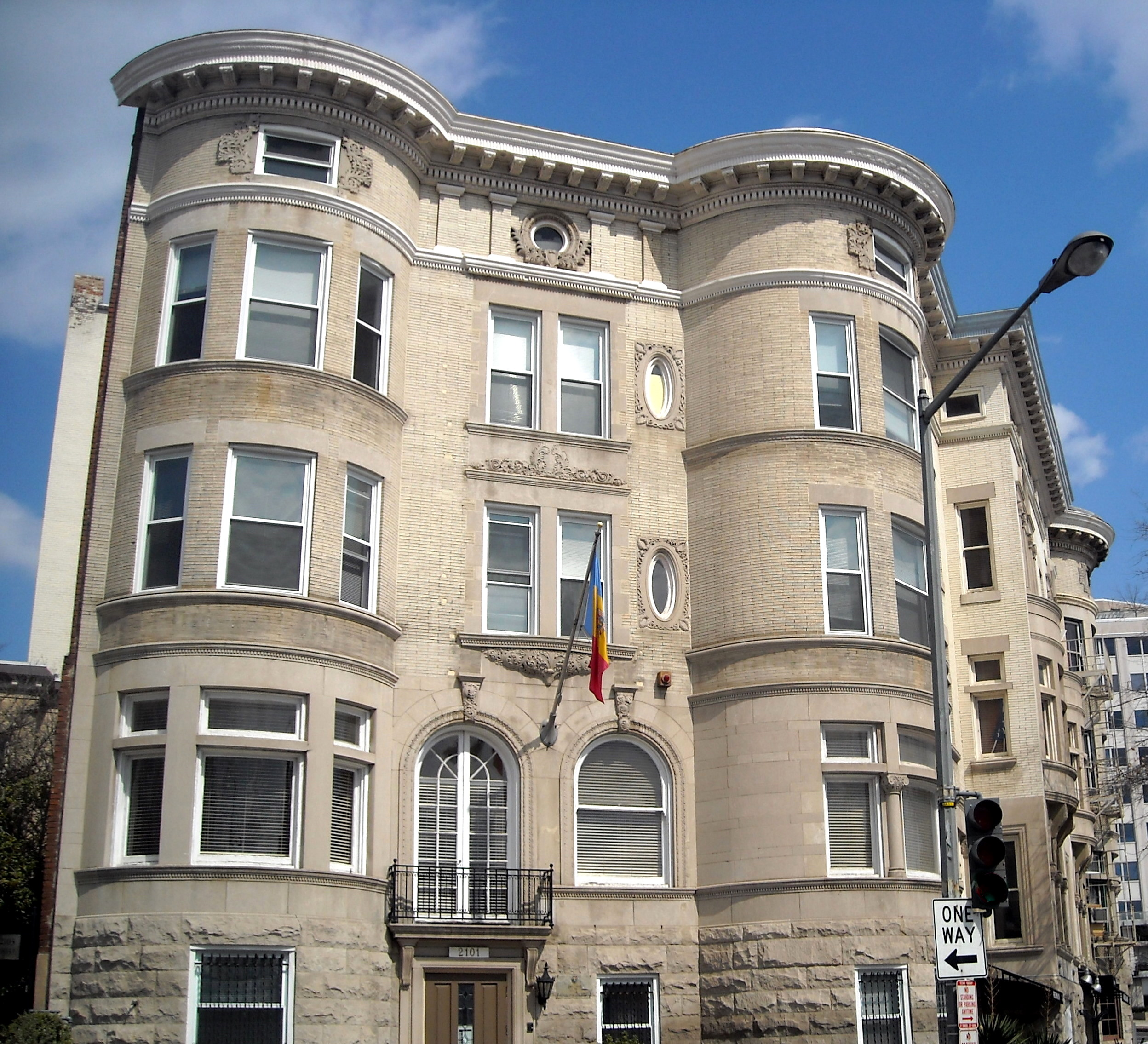
Newell's former residence in Washington, D.C.

== Reclamation Service ==
During the next few years the organization of the Reclamation Service was completed and plans outlined for extensive work in each of the western states, work being initiated in most of these. In 1907, when Mr. Walcott left the Geological Survey to become Secretary of the Smithsonian Institution, the Reclamation Service was organized as a separate bureau of the Department of the Interior with Mr. Newell as Director and Arthur P. Davis as Chief Engineer. Construction was rapidly pushed until twenty-six projects, including reservoirs, canals and related works were completed in whole or part, notably the Roosevelt, Shoshone, Arrowrock, Gunnison Tunnels and others, involving the investment of over $100,000,000, in 100 dams, of which ten form reservoirs of national importance also 25 miles (40 km) of tunnels, 13,000 miles (21,000 km) of irrigating canals and ditches with regulating works, bridges, steam and hydro-electric generators, transmission lines, pumps and devices connected with supplying water to 20,000 farms. Special efforts were made to attain the highest practicable economy and efficiency in the execution of the work and to meet the need and desires of the settlers under them.

== Offices and awards ==
Frederick Haynes Newell was Secretary of the National Geographic Society from 1892 to 1893 and from 1897 to 1899, Secretary of the American Forestry Association after 1895, President of the American Association of Engineers in 1919. He was awarded the Cullum Geographical Medal by the American Geographical Society in 1918.

== Personal life ==
In 1877, his father, Augustus W. Newell, married his second wife Miss Phoebe Lewis. They begot Lewis, Henry Foster, and Augustus William Jr.

Frederick Haynes Newell married Effie Josephine Mackintosh April 3, 1890 in Milton, Massachusetts. Her father was John Sherman Mackintosh, the grandson of John Sherman and the great-grandson of American founding father Roger Sherman.

Newell died at his offices in Washington, D.C., on July 5, 1932. He was buried at Needham Cemetery in Massachusetts.

== Legacy ==
In 2003 the USGS and Bureau of Reclamation jointly opened an office building in Boise, Idaho that was named for Newell, recognizing the important role he played in the development of these two bureaus within the Department of the Interior. Public Law 108-462 designated the building as the "F.H. Newell Building". It was signed into law on December 21, 2004. The building is located at 230 Collins Road, Boise, Idaho. The building features a number of energy efficiency features.

== Books by Newell ==
- Oil Well Drilling (1888)
- Agriculture by Irrigation (1894)
- Hydrography of the Arid Regions (1891)
- The Public Lands of the United States (1895)
- Irrigation in the United States (1902)
- Hawaii, Its Natural Resources (1909)
- Principles of Irrigation Engineering (1913)
- Irrigation Management (1916)
- Engineering as a Career (1916)
- Water Resources, Present and Future Uses (1919)
