= Copper Fire =

2002 wildfire in Southern California

- Part of the 2002 California wildfires
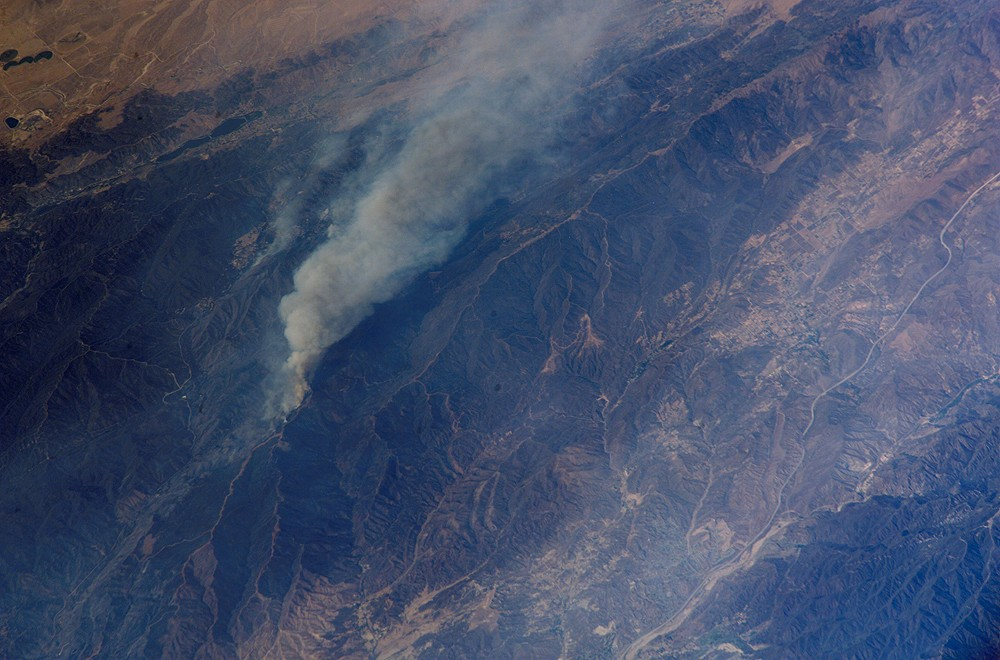
- In a photograph taken from the International Space Station on June 7, 2002, the Copper Fire burns in the hills outside Santa Clarita.
- Date: June 5 –; June 12, 2002; (8 days)
- Location: Los Angeles County, Southern California, United States
- Coordinates: 34.47°N 118.55°W

Statistics
- Burned area: 23,407 acres (9,472 ha; 37 sq mi; 95 km^{2})

Impacts
- Injuries: 9
- Evacuated: >2,000 people
- Structures lost: 26
- Cost: $6.6 million; (equivalent to about $11 million in 2024)

Ignition
- Cause: Equipment use

Map
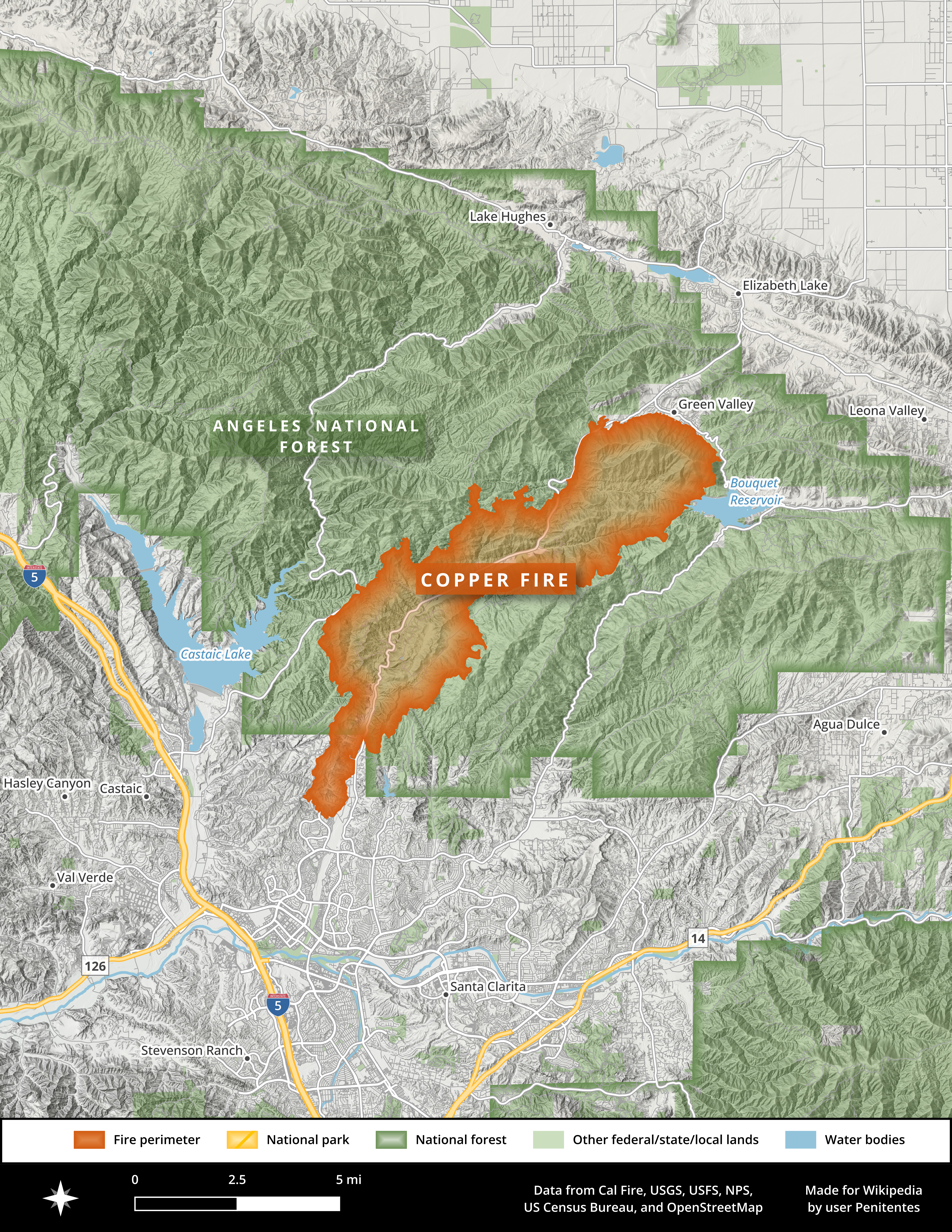
- The fire burned in an area north of the city of Santa Clarita, in the Angeles National Forest.

- The Copper Fire burned in northwestern Los Angeles County.

The Copper Fire was a wildfire in Los Angeles County, Southern California, in June 2002. After igniting on June 5 near the city of Santa Clarita, the fire burned for a week and consumed 23,407 acres (9,472 hectares), damaging wildlife habitat and historic structures in the Angeles National Forest. It was fully contained on June 12. The fire destroyed more than two dozen buildings and resulted in at least nine firefighter injuries. The federal government later sued two contractors, arguing that their negligence had sparked the fire during construction work. The suit resulted in a jury award in the government's favor of more than $36 million (equivalent to more than $51 million in 2024). The award was the first ever in the United States for environmental damages from a wildfire.

== Background ==
The Copper Fire burned in hot, dry, and windy conditions in medium-heavy brush in steep, inaccessible drainages—primarily in San Francisquito Canyon—among the Sierra Pelona mountains of the Transverse Ranges north of Los Angeles and south of the Antelope Valley. The fire was the fifth-largest of the 2002 California wildfire season, in which 8,171 wildfires burned a total of 538,216 acres (217,808 ha).

In the winter and spring before the Copper Fire, Southern California received very little rain, marking its fourth year of below-normal precipitation. Vegetation dryness approached record levels, and firefighters remarked on the surprising vigor of even small grass fires in the spring. It was one of the earliest fire seasons in decades; fire officials declared the beginning of fire season in mid-April in much of Southern California, a month before the usual date. By June, vegetation in Southern California was as dry as it normally was in September.

== Cause ==
The Copper Fire began on Wednesday, June 5, 2002. That year, the Newhall County Water District had hired Merco Construction Engineers, Inc. as a general contractor to build four steel water reservoirs for a planned community housing project near Santa Clarita. Merco then subcontracted the construction of the reservoirs out to CB&I Constructors, Inc.

CB&I offered its crews a financial bonus if they completed work more quickly than planned. On the afternoon of June 5, a CB&I employee was using an electric grinder—which produces a stream of sparks and slag as it smooths and grinds metal—on the roof of one of the reservoirs. Neither CB&I nor Merco took recommended fire prevention precautions, including clearing brush 100 feet (30 m) from the tanks, spraying water on dry vegetation, or keeping someone on the ground to watch for fires while the rest of the crew worked on the roof. At approximately 2:40 p.m. PDT, sparks and hot metal fragments from the electric grinder landed in, and ignited, nearby brush. The workers spotted the fire, but it was too large to control before they had even descended to the ground.

== Progression ==
Named for its point of ignition near Copper Hill Road, the Copper Fire quickly expanded, burning northeast. By the end of the day, the fire had burned 1,500 acres (610 ha), destroying eight non-residential buildings. Firefighter teams assembled in Green Valley, a rural community placed under a mandatory evacuation order, to protect structures.

By the morning of Thursday, June 6, the Copper Fire had burned 5,600 acres (2,300 ha). It continued to grow as the combination of high temperatures, erratic winds, and difficult terrain drove containment down from an initial 20 percent to five percent over the course of the day—this despite the efforts of a dozen aircraft and 700–1,000 firefighters. As the fire burned, it threatened to overheat electric power transmission lines connecting Southern California to Northern California, which might have caused rolling blackouts. Heat from the fire caused one of the major lines to shut down, and a second was close to that point before the fire front began to shift away from the area. At 5:00 p.m., the head of the fire crested the hills above Green Valley, and an hour later a second flank of the fire entered the canyon as firefighters fought to protect the structures there. They were partially successful: by the end of the day, the fire had burned more than 15,600 acres (6,300 ha) and had added five homes to its toll.

On Friday, June 7, the Copper Fire had burned about 23,500 acres (9,500 ha). The weather remained adverse, with high temperatures, low humidity, and continued onshore winds of up to 20 miles per hour (32 km/h). To hem the fire in, firefighters set backfires along Spunky Canyon Road. By the end of the day, the fire was 15 percent contained, largely to San Francisquito and Bouquet canyons, and a U.S. Forest Service spokesperson cautioned that it was "going to be another couple days before we get a handle on this". No further structure loss occurred after this point, with over 2,000 firefighters engaged along the 20 miles (32 km) of total fire line.

By the night of Saturday, June 8, evacuees from Green Valley were allowed to return and total containment of the fire was listed at 55 percent. The fire's size was unchanged from the previous day's figure of ~23,500 acres (9,500 ha), and the difficult weather had eased; cooler temperatures, more humidity, and a marine layer prevailed over the fire area. The most active section of the fire was located near Spunky Canyon Road and Bouquet Reservoir, to the east of Green Valley.

A small flare-up on the fire perimeter occurred on June 10, but it was contained, and the fire grew no larger than its approximate perimeter on June 8. The fire was ultimately declared contained on June 12, having burned a total of 23,407 acres (9,472 ha) over the course of a week. The cost of containing the fire reached approximately $6.6 million (equivalent to about $11 million in 2024).

== Effects ==
The Copper Fire did not cause any deaths. At least nine firefighters sustained minor injuries.

Santa Clarita declared a local emergency on June 7. More than 2,000 people in the rural communities of Green Valley and Warm Springs, 10 miles north of Santa Clarita, were placed under mandatory evacuation orders. The American Red Cross established temporary shelters for evacuees at Saugus High School and Highland High School in Palmdale.

The Copper Fire destroyed 26 structures, including at least nine homes. The toll also included the entirety of the Hazel Dell Mining Camp, a historically significant abandoned 20th-century graphite mine: all of the camp's wooden structures burned and the two horizontal mining shafts collapsed. The damage was so extensive that the site became ineligible for listing on the National Register of Historic Places. The fire did an additional $330,000 in damage to county roads.

=== Environmental impacts ===
The Copper Fire resulted in major environmental harms in the Angeles National Forest, particularly in San Francisquito Canyon. It destroyed nearly all the native vegetation in the area, resulting in an infestation of giant cane, an invasive reed. The destruction of the vegetation also aided in erosion, tripling the rate of sedimentation in the San Francisquito Creek watershed as it filled with ash and debris. The fire and following floods also impacted over 90 percent of the endangered California red-legged frog's habitat in the Angeles National Forest: before the fire researchers had logged 250–500 adult frogs along San Francisquito Creek, a range which fell to 30–50 by 2009 and led to concerns among researchers about the lack of genetic diversity among the surviving population. The fire also impacted the unarmored three-spined stickleback population, an endangered subspecies of fish, and "notably reduced" the population of Nevin's barberry, an at-risk endemic plant species. The loss of vegetation also resulted in an increase in illegal and ecologically harmful off-highway vehicle use in the area.

== Litigation ==
In 2008, the United States Attorney's Office for the Central District of California filed a lawsuit against Merco Construction Engineers, Inc. and CB&I Constructors, Inc., seeking to recover costs associated with fire suppression and environmental harms. According to the government's lawsuit, CB&I's negligence was responsible for the fire because the employee operating the electric grinder had directed sparks towards the flammable hillside, and Merco's negligence was also responsible because an employee of theirs who was supposed to be watering down the site to prevent fires "failed to adequately perform that task".

On September 30, 2009, after a week-long trial and a day-long federal jury deliberation, Merco and CB&I were ordered to collectively pay more than $36.4 million (equivalent to more than $51.6 million in 2024): ~$6.6 million for the cost of fire suppression; ~$500,000 for BAER costs; ~$500,000 for remediating burned infrastructure; and $28.8 million for environmental damages. CB&I was found to be 65 percent liable and Merco found to be 35 percent liable. According to the Central District's press release, the penalty marked "the largest such jury award ever in a federal firefighting cost-recovery case and the first time a jury has awarded damages for environmental harm caused by a wildfire".

== See also ==
- 2002 California wildfires
- Wolf Fire (2002)
