= McNally Fire =

2002 wildfire in Central California

- Part of the 2002 California wildfires
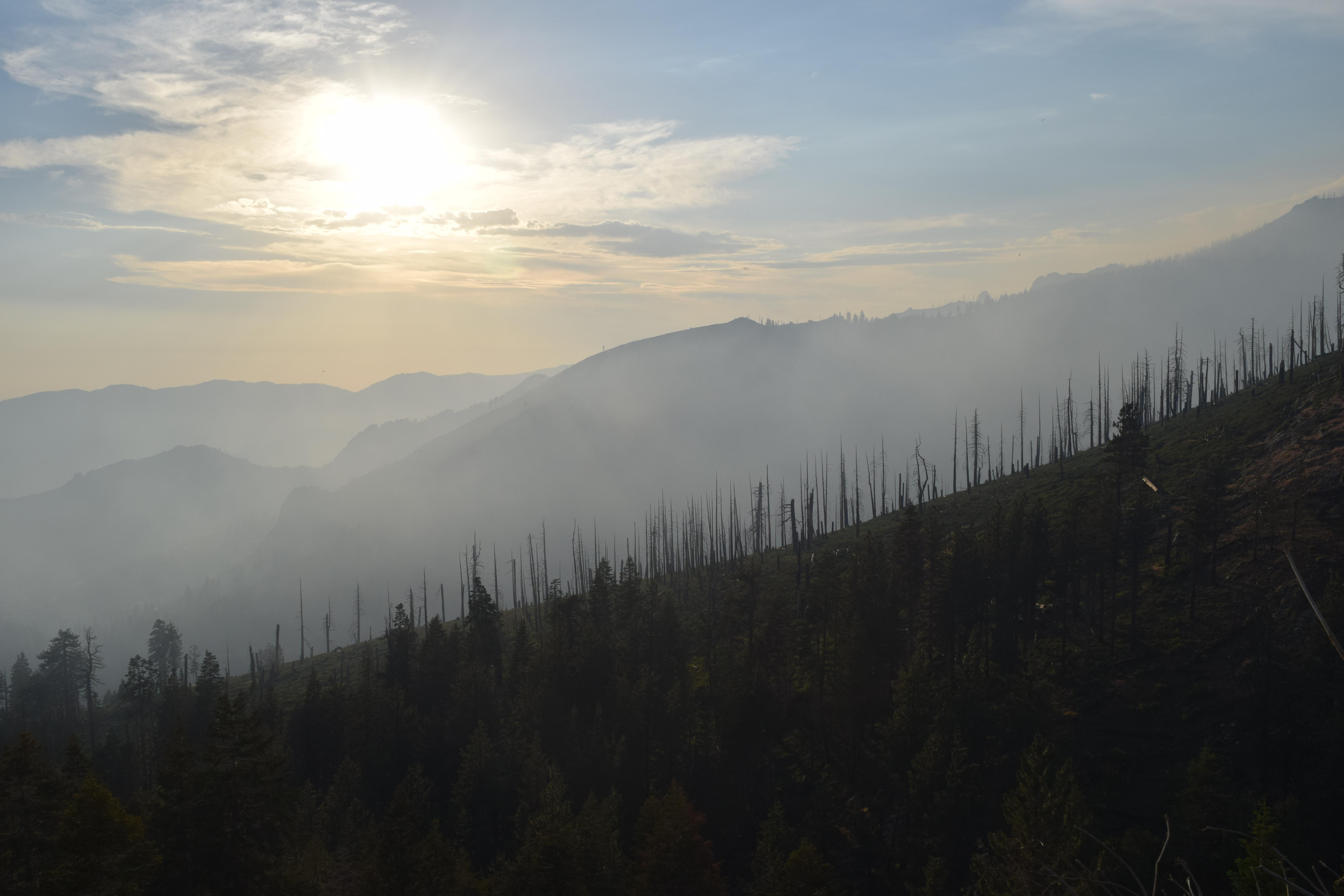
- Burned snags from the McNally Fire
- Date: July 21, 2002 –; August 29, 2002; (40 days)
- Location: Sequoia National Forest, Tulare County, California

Statistics
- Burned area: 150,696 acres (610 km^{2})

Impacts
- Deaths: Unknown
- Injuries: Unknown
- Structures lost: 17
- Cost: $45.7 million (2002 USD)

Ignition
- Cause: Abandoned campfire

The McNally Fire was a massive wildfire in the Sequoia National Forest which burned 150,696 acres (609.8 km^{2}) in July and August 2002, and the largest wildfire of the 2002 California wildfire season. The fire burned from July 21 to August 29, 2002, through the Sequoia and Inyo National Forest, as well as 5% of Giant Sequoia National Monument. It destroyed 14 structures and cost an estimated $45.7 million to put out. The blaze was started due to the "careless use of fire" near the Roads End Resort in Kern Canyon, and spread east through the canyon and threatened the communities of Johnsondale and Ponderosa. It burned within one mile (1.6 km) of the Packsaddle Grove of giant sequoias.

== Effects ==
Of the acreage burned in the fire, over 73,000 acres were burned at a high to moderate severity. This left much of the soil dry and stripped, making parts of the Sequoia National Forest vulnerable to soil erosion and flooding. In November 2002, a strong rainstorm hit the fire-affected area, dumping 20 inches of rain over the course of 48 hours. This heavy rain, in conjunction with the stripped soil, caused the Kern River to swell rapidly and flood the surrounding areas of the forest. Following this flooding, an additional $3 million in emergency funds were used, in an attempt to minimize future damage from erosion and flooding.

Recovery efforts from the fire began in 2005 and involved the planting of 400,000 saplings over 5,000 acres of the forest, with the rest being left to recover and regrow naturally. The replanted areas continue to be monitored for growth, with further replanting occurring in areas with low survival rates. However, the entire regrowth process from the McNally Fire is expected take 150–250 years.
