= 2002 California wildfires =

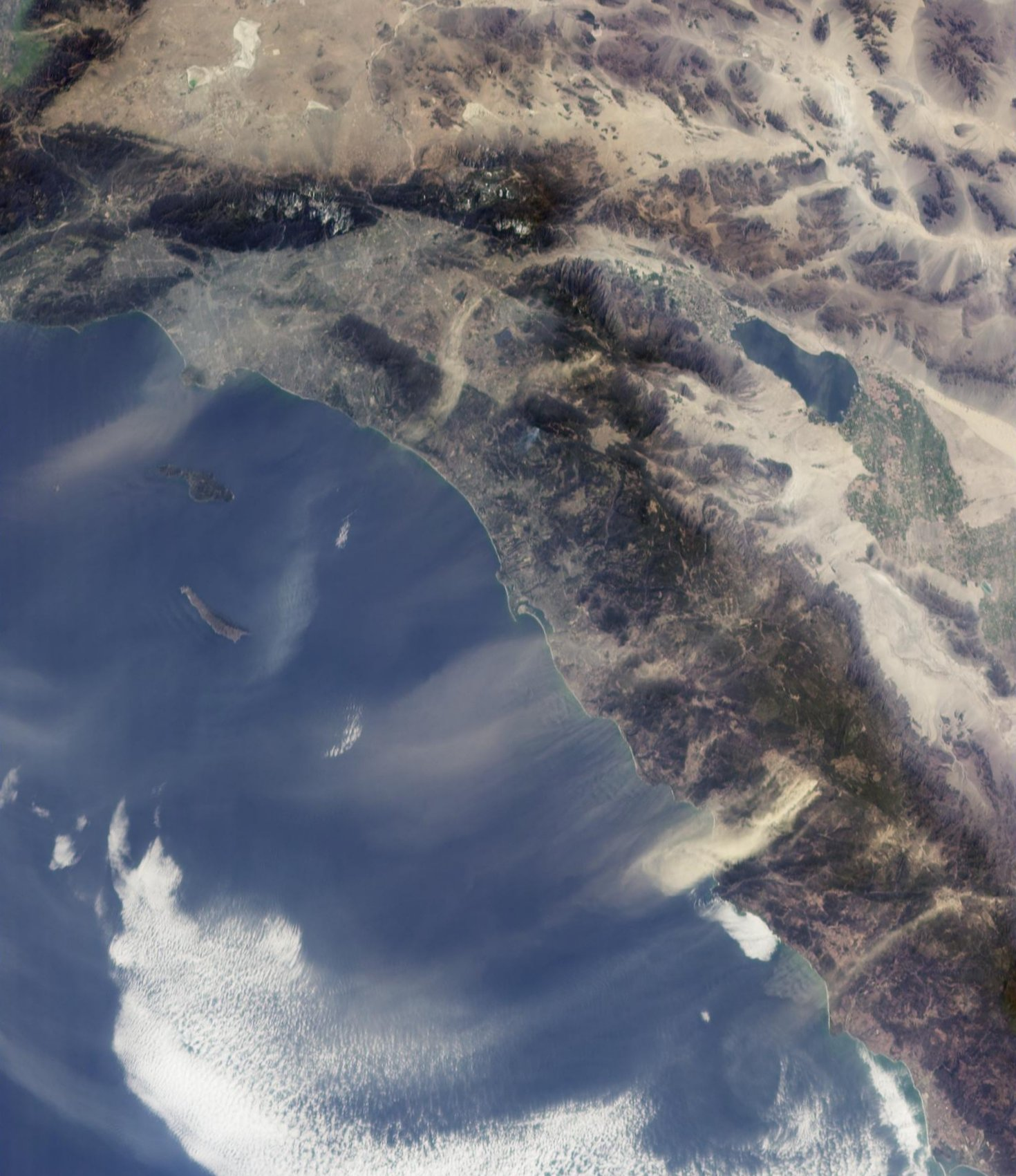
- NASA satellite image of Santa Ana winds blowing across Southern California and starting wildfires, on February 9, 2002

Statistics
- Total fires: 8,328
- Total area: 969,890 acres (3,925.0 km^{2})

Impacts
- Deaths: 6 firefighters killed
- Injuries: Unknown
- Cost: $308.977 million (2002 USD)

During 2002, 8,328 wildfires burned 969,890 acres (3,925.0 km^{2}) of land in the US state of California.

== Background ==
The timing of "fire season" in California is variable, depending on the amount of prior winter and spring precipitation, the frequency and severity of weather such as heat waves and wind events, and moisture content in vegetation. Northern California typically sees wildfire activity between late spring and early fall, peaking in the summer with hotter and drier conditions. Occasional cold frontal passages can bring wind and lightning. The timing of fire season in Southern California is similar, peaking between late spring and fall. The severity and duration of peak activity in either part of the state is modulated in part by weather events: downslope/offshore wind events can lead to critical fire weather, while onshore flow and Pacific weather systems can bring conditions that hamper wildfire growth.

== List of wildfires ==
Below is a list of fires that exceeded 1,000 acres (4.0 km^{2}) or caused a notable amount of damage during the 2002 fire season. The list is taken from CAL FIRE's list of large fires.

Name	County	Acres	Km^{2}	Start date	Contained Date (Note: Containment means that fire crews have established and secured control lines around the fire's perimeter. These lines are artificial barriers, like trenches or cleared vegetation, designed to stop the fire's spread, or natural barriers like rivers. Containment reflects progress in managing the fire but does not necessarily mean the fire is starved of fuel, under control, or put out.)	Notes
Green	Riverside	2,400	9.7	February 9, 2002	February 13, 2002	
Gavilan	San Diego	5,763	23.3	February 10, 2002	February 15, 2002	43 buildings destroyed, 13 buildings damaged
Nicholas	Madera	12,000	48.6	March 16, 2002	March 16, 2002	
Aliso	San Diego	2,400	9.7	March 21, 2002	March 22, 2002	
Bouquet	Los Angeles	4,977	20.1	May 11, 2002	May 13, 2002	
Mateo	San Diego	1,500	6.1	May 13, 2002	May 13, 2002	
State 925	Riverside	1,472	6.0	May 13, 2002	May 15, 2002	
Ahlem	Merced	6,000	24.3	May 23, 2002	May 23, 2002	
Arrowhead	San Bernardino	2,688	10.9	May 31, 2002	June 5, 2002	
Wolf	Ventura	21,645	87.6	June 1, 2002	June 14, 2002	6 structures destroyed
Copper	Los Angeles	23,407	94.7	June 5, 2002	June 12, 2002	26 structures destroyed
Skyway	Butte	2,000	8.1	June 8, 2002	June 9, 2002	
Davis	San Luis Obispo	2,118	8.6	June 9, 2002	June 9, 2002	
Forks	Siskiyou	1,400	5.7	June 12, 2002	June 15, 2002	
Bluecut	San Bernardino	6,864	27.8	June 16, 2002	June 22, 2002	
Borel	Kern	3,430	13.9	June 15, 2002	June 17, 2002	19 structures destroyed
Sudden Ranch	Santa Barbara	7,782	31.5	June 17, 2002	June 19, 2002	1 structure destroyed
Copo	Los Angeles	1,460	5.9	June 18, 2002	June 21, 2002	1 structures destroyed
Vieux	Alameda	1,029	4.2	June 18, 2002	June 18, 2002	
Troy	San Diego	1,188	4.8	June 19, 2002	June 22, 2002	3 buildings destroyed, 1 damaged
Stage	Tulare	1,100	4.5	June 22, 2002	June 22, 2002	
Louisiana	San Bernardino	6,574	26.6	June 26, 2002	June 30, 2002	7 buildings destroyed
Cottonwood	Merced	1,000	4.0	July 4, 2002	July 4, 2002	
596	Lassen	4,500	18.2	July 12, 2002	July 13, 2002	
Garnet	San Diego	1,166	4.7	July 13, 2002	July 16, 2002	
Mussolini	Siskiyou	3,260	13.2	July 13, 2002	July 16, 2002	
Sour Biscuit	Del Norte	28,772	116.4	July 13, 2002	August 2, 2002	
Inyo Complex	Inyo	6,550	26.5	July 15, 2002	July 16, 2002	
Horse Complex	Lassen	1,850	7.5	July 15, 2002	July 15, 2002	
Highway 58	San Luis Obispo	1,380	5.6	July 18, 2002	July 19, 2002	6 structures destroyed
Deer	Kern	1,800	7.3	July 21, 2002	July 24, 2002	94 structures destroyed
McNally	Tulare	150,696	609.8	July 21, 2002	September 3, 2002	17 structures destroyed
Stanza	Siskiyou	2,880	11.7	July 26, 2002	August 2, 2002	3 firefighters killed
Pines	San Diego	61,690	249.7	July 29, 2002	August 16, 2002	160 structures destroyed, 4 damaged; caused by damaged electric power lines
Fort Hunter Liggett	Monterey	1,400	5.7	August 10, 2002	August 11, 2002	
Curve	Los Angeles	20,857	84.4	September 1, 2002	September 5, 2002	73 structures destroyed
Freeway	Los Angeles	1,043	4.2	September 1, 2002	September 3, 2002	
Leona	Los Angeles	5,124	20.7	September 3, 2002	September 6, 2002	16 structures destroyed
Mountain	Los Angeles	594	2.4	September 9, 2002	September 11, 2002	
Oasis	Los Angeles	1,305	5.3	September 14, 2002	September 14, 2002	
Sierra	Placer	1,305	5.3	September 18, 2002	September 18, 2002	21 structures destroyed
Williams	Los Angeles	38,094	154.2	September 22, 2002	October 7, 2002	77 structures destroyed
Croy	Santa Clara	3,127	12.7	September 23, 2002	September 28, 2002	34 structures destroyed, 4 damaged
Cone	Lassen	2,006	8.1	September 26, 2002	September 30, 2002	
Sixteen	Yolo	1,500	6.1	October 1, 2002	October 2, 2002	
Plum	El Dorado	1,765	7.1	November 26, 2002	November 28, 2002	
Pine	Mendocino	1,200	4.9	November 26, 2002	November 28, 2002	7 structures destroyed

== Gallery of maps ==
Maps of significant wildfires in 2002 in California

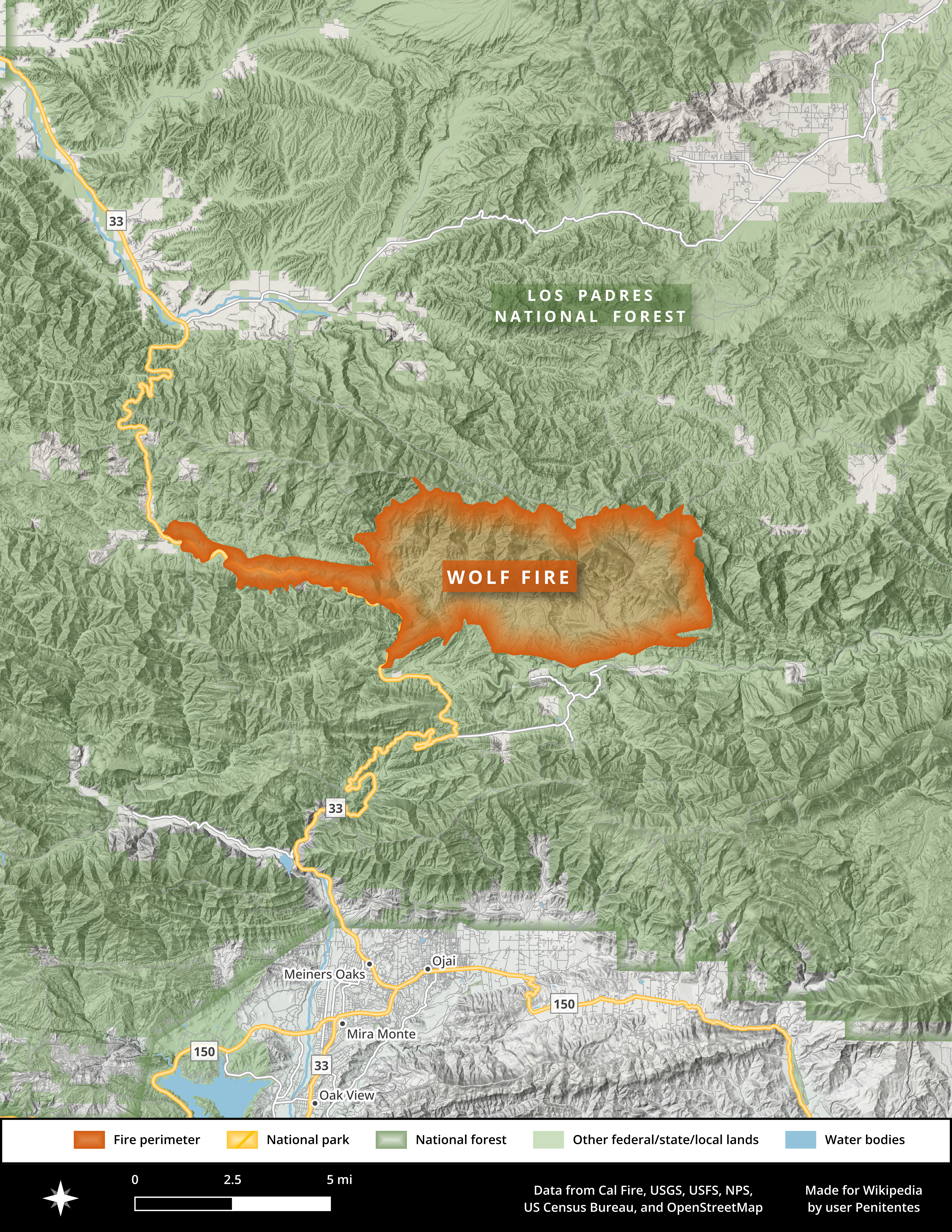
Wolf Fire

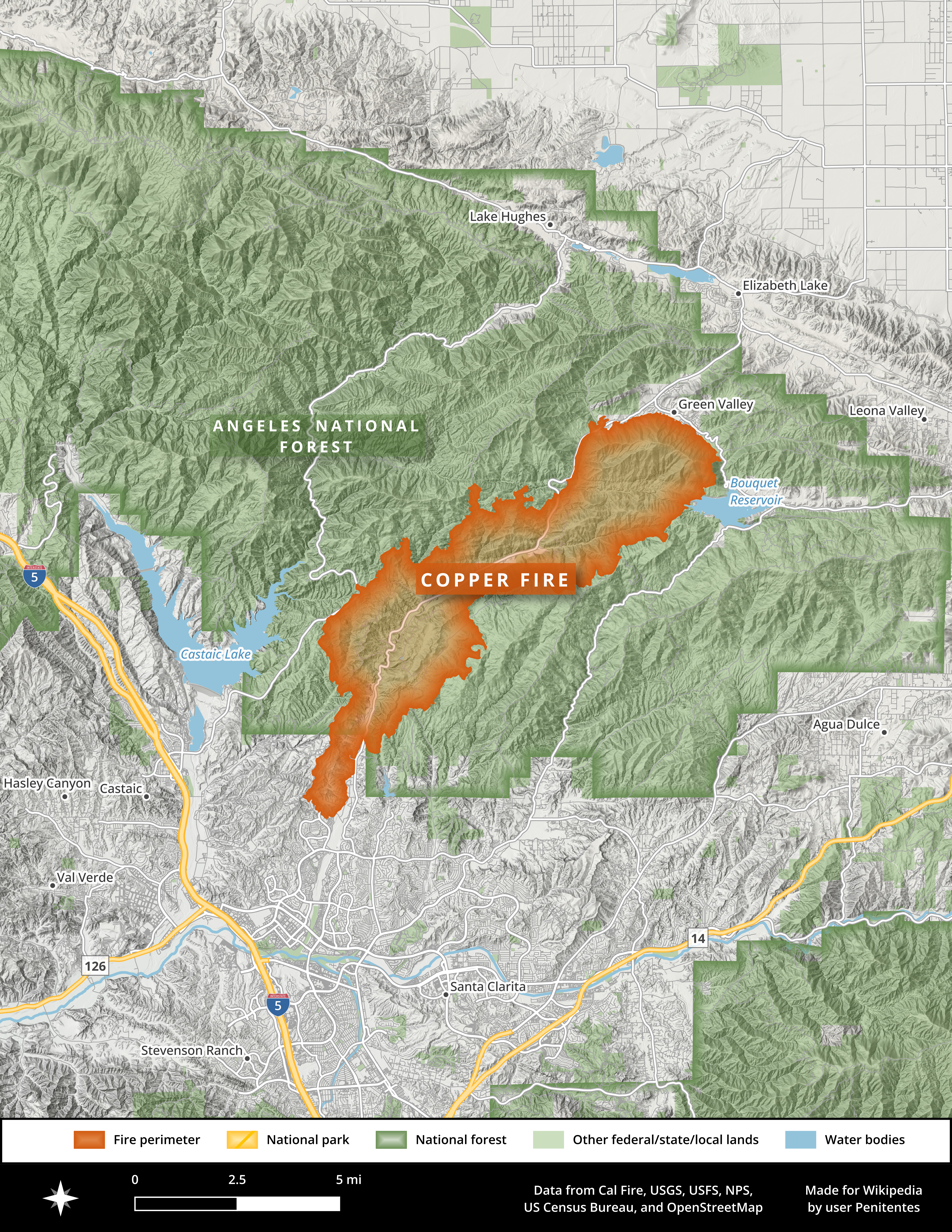
Copper Fire

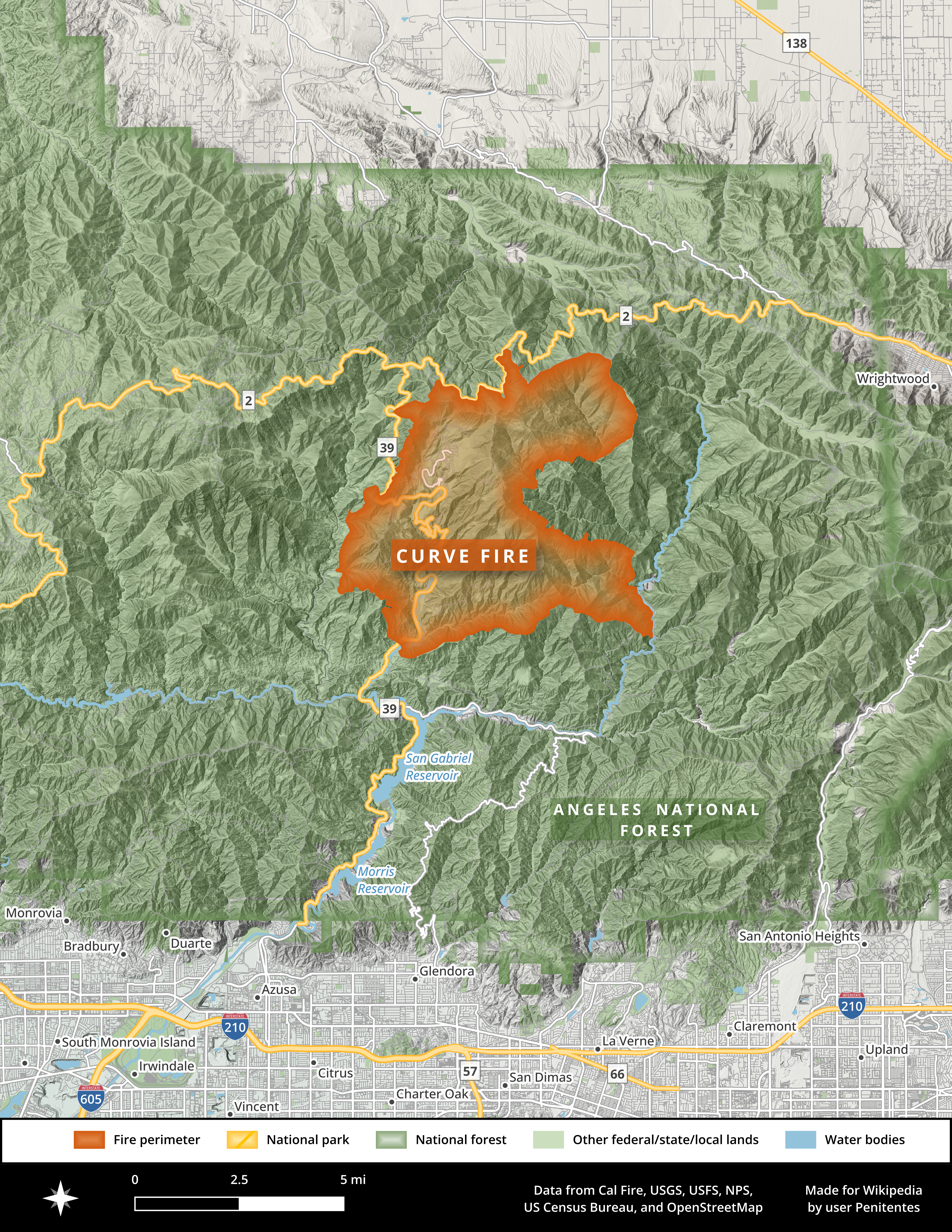
Curve Fire

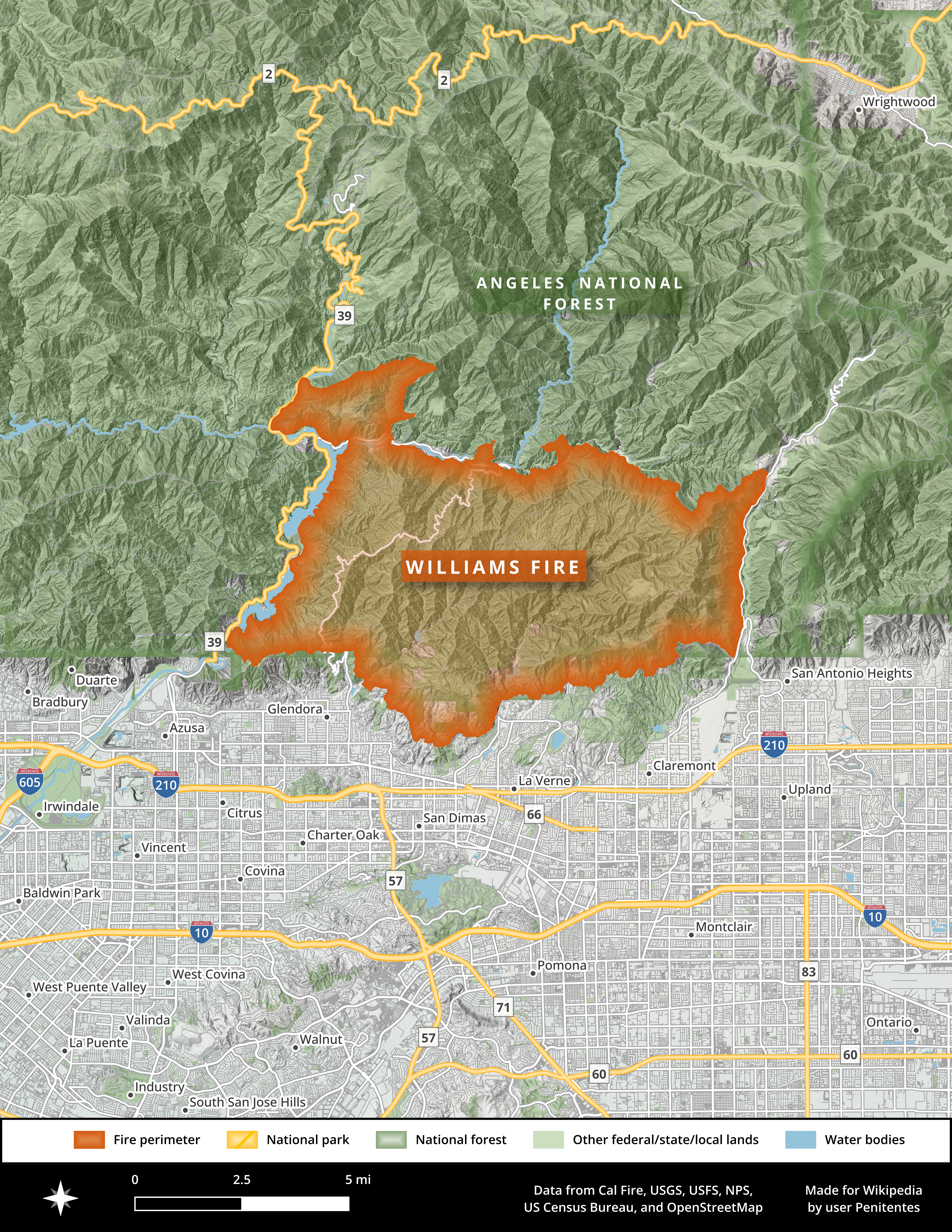
Williams Fire
