= Embudo Stream Gauging Station =

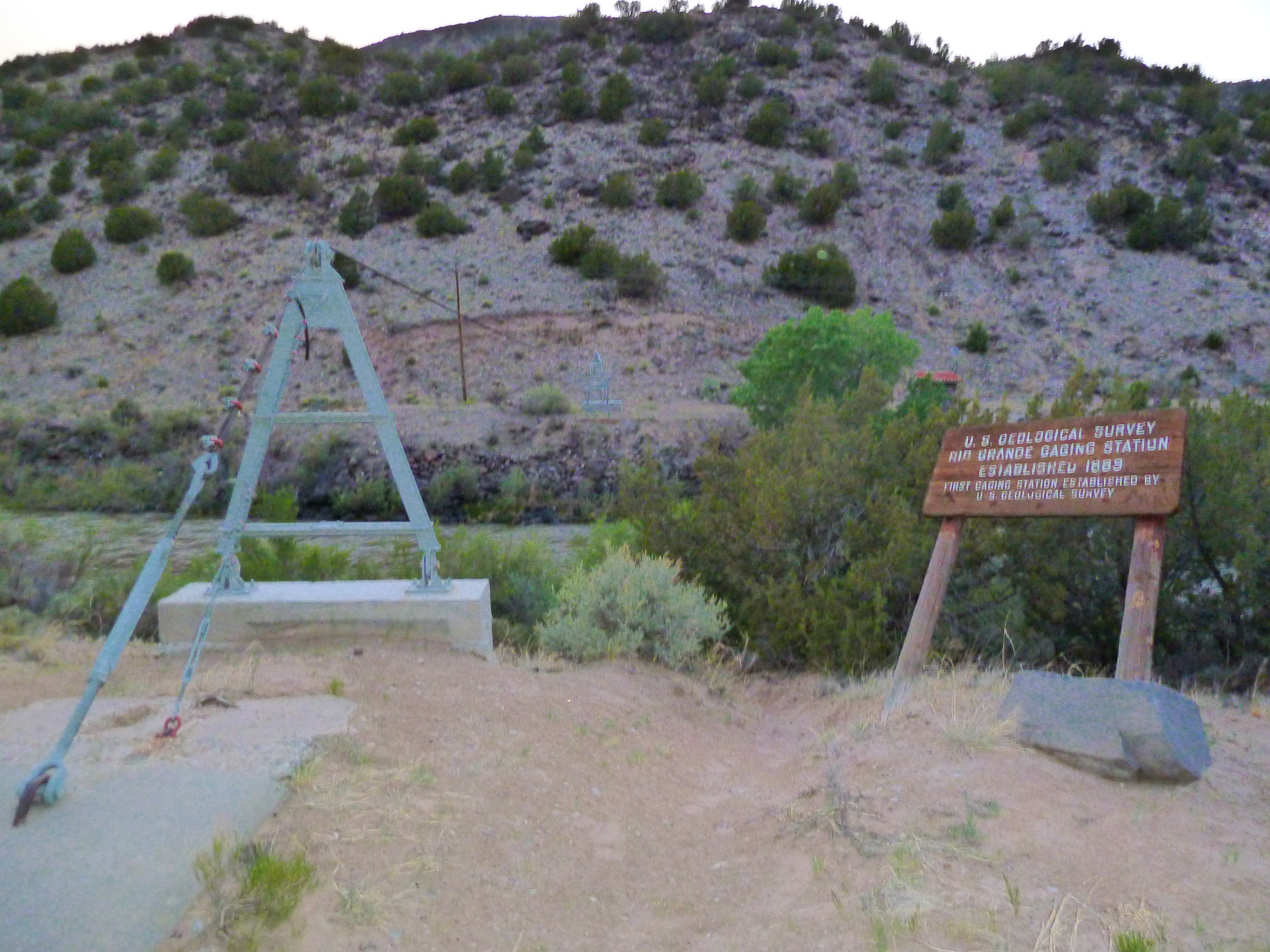
- The Gauging Station in 2011
- Location: Embudo, New Mexico

NM State Register of Cultural Properties
- Designated: 25 Jan 1974
- Reference no.: 309

Historic Civil Engineering Landmark

The Embudo Stream Gauging Station is a stream gauge established in 1888 as the United States Geologic Survey's first training center for hydrographers. The station, near the town of Embudo along the Rio Grande in northern New Mexico, was used to develop tools and techniques for measuring stream flow in the arid, western United States.

== History ==
The Embudo Stream Gauging Station was established as part of the United States Geologic Survey Irrigation Survey, a project to map water basins and collect streamflow data in an effort to make informed irrigation infrastructure decisions, directed by Clarence Dutton. While Dutton was able to locate topographers and irrigation engineers for the survey, he was not able to locate hydrographers, so a training camp was established at Embudo, New Mexico. Engineers, including camp director Frederick H.Newell, first arrived in December 1888. While canvas tents and cots were purchased, the unanticipated cold of the higher elevation site led to the use of shallow trenches with blankets rather than cots and small cave dug in a nearby hillside for sleeping.

By early March 1889, the camp hosted 21 residents, including 15 students. The training period ended in April 1889 with ten of the students taking on hydrographer positions in the Irrigation Survey. Stream measurements were continued by the local railroad agent until 1904 and were then discontinued. Measurements resumed in 1912 by a new railroad agent, and in 1915 the station operation was taken on by the State of New Mexico. The USGS resumed operation of the stream gauging station in July 1931.

== Recognition ==
The site was designated a Historic Civil Engineering Landmark by the American Society of Civil Engineers in 1973 and listed on the New Mexico State Register of Cultural Properties in 1974.

== See also ==
- Willow Beach Gauging Station
