= Stream gauge =

Location used to monitor surface water flow

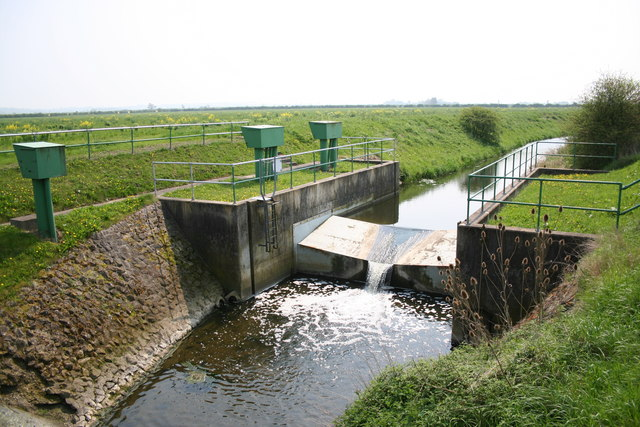
Brant Broughton Gauging Station on the River Brant in Lincolnshire, England.

A stream gauge, streamgage or stream gauging station is a location used by hydrologists or environmental scientists to monitor and test terrestrial bodies of water. Hydrometric measurements of water level surface elevation ("stage") and/or volumetric discharge (flow) are generally taken and observations of biota and water quality may also be made. The locations of gauging stations are often found on topographical maps. Some gauging stations are highly automated and may include telemetry capability transmitted to a central data logging facility.

== Measurement equipment ==
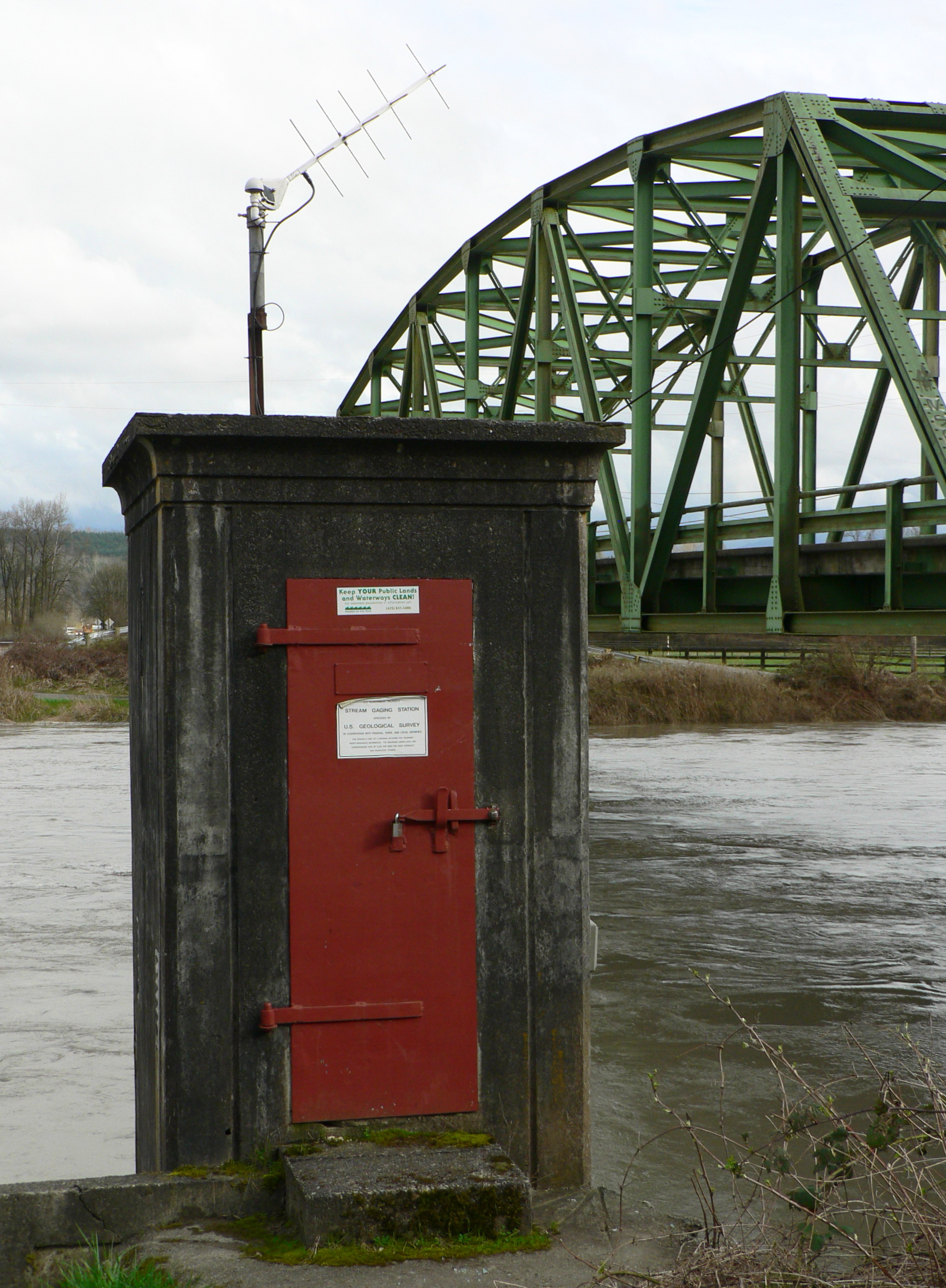
Stream Gaging Station, Carnation, Washington

Automated direct measurement of stream discharge is difficult at present. Mathematically, measuring stream discharge is estimating the volumetric flow rate, which is in general a flux integral and thus requires many cross-sectional velocity measurements. In place of the direct measurement of stream discharge, one or more surrogate measurements can be used as proxy variables to produce discharge values. In the majority of cases, a stage (the elevation of the water surface) measurement is used as the surrogate. Low gradient (or shallow-sloped) streams are highly influenced by variable downstream channel conditions. For these streams, a second stream gauge would be installed, and the slope of the water surface would be calculated between the gauges. This value would be used along with the stage measurement to more accurately determine the streamflow discharge. Improvements in the accuracy of velocity sensors have also allowed the use of water velocity as a reliable surrogate for streamflow discharge at sites with a stable cross-sectional area. These sensors are permanently mounted in the stream and measure velocity at a particular location in the stream.

In those instances where only a stage measurement is used as the surrogate, a rating curve must be constructed. A rating curve is the functional relation between stage and discharge. It is determined by making repeated discrete measurements of streamflow discharge using a velocimeter and some means to measure the channel geometry to determine the cross-sectional area of the channel. The technicians and hydrologists responsible for determining the rating curve visit the site routinely, with special trips to measure the hydrologic extremes (floods and droughts), and make a discharge measurement by following an explicit set of instructions or standard operating procedures (SOPs).

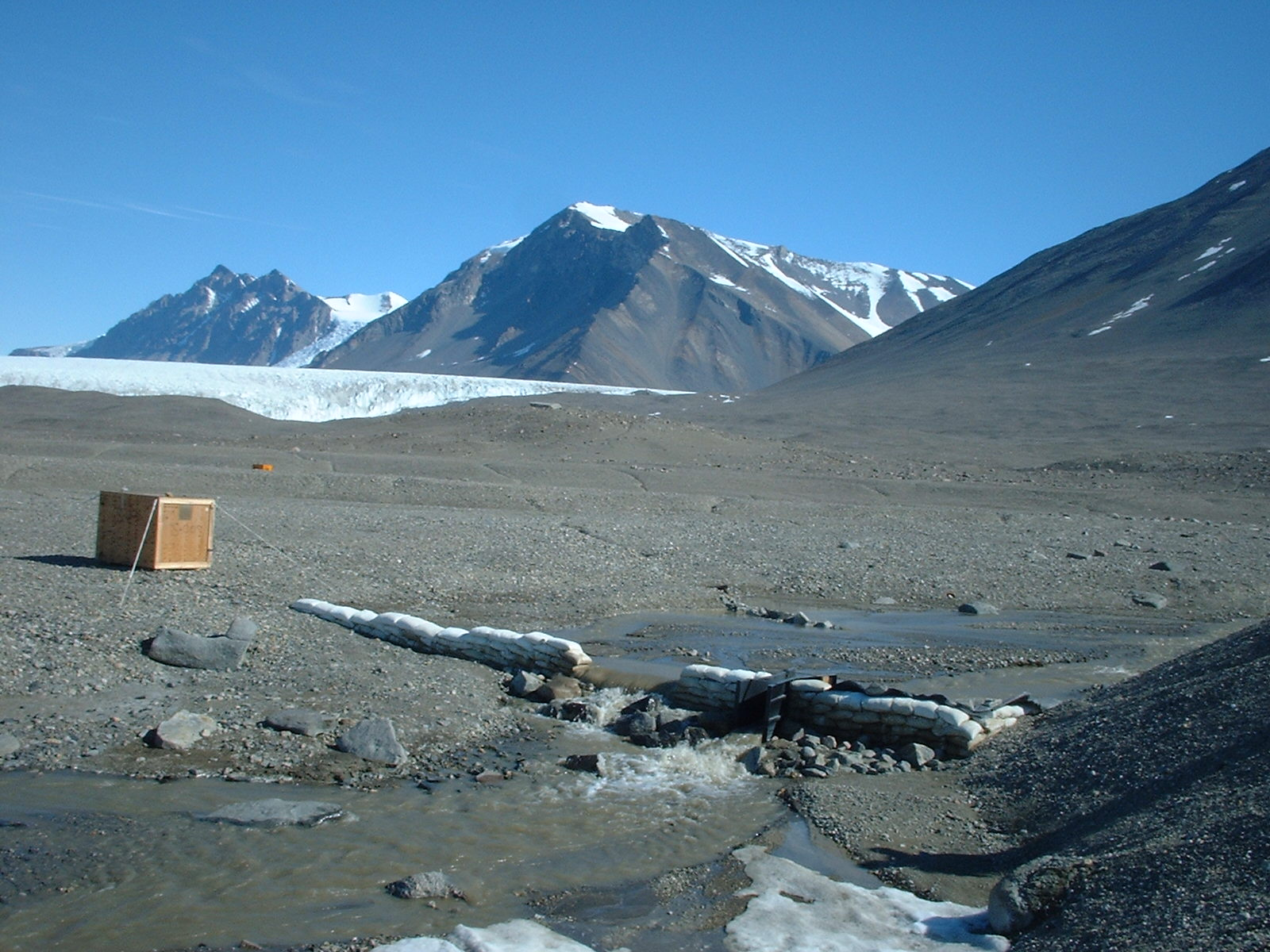
December 12, 2001 photo of the USGS streamflow-gaging station at Huey Creek, McMurdo Dry Valleys, Antarctica.

Once the rating curve is established, it can be used in conjunction with stage measurements to determine the volumetric streamflow discharge. This record then serves as an assessment of the volume of water that passes by the stream gauge and is useful for many tasks associated with hydrology.

In those instances where a velocity measurement is additionally used as a surrogate, an index velocity determination is conducted. This analysis uses a velocity sensor, often either magnetic or acoustic, to measure the velocity of the flow at a particular location in the stream cross section. Once again, discrete measurements of streamflow discharge are made by the technician or hydrologist at a variety of stages. For each discrete determination of streamflow discharge, the mean velocity of the cross section is determined by dividing streamflow discharge by the cross-sectional area. A rating curve, similar to that used for stage-discharge determinations, is constructed using the mean velocity and the index velocity from the permanently mounted meter. An additional rating curve is constructed that relates stage of the stream to cross-sectional area. Using these two ratings, the automatically collected stage produces an estimate of the cross-sectional area, and the automatically collected index velocity produces an estimate of the mean velocity of the cross section. The streamflow discharge is computed as the product of the estimate of the cross section area and the estimate of the mean velocity of the streamflow.

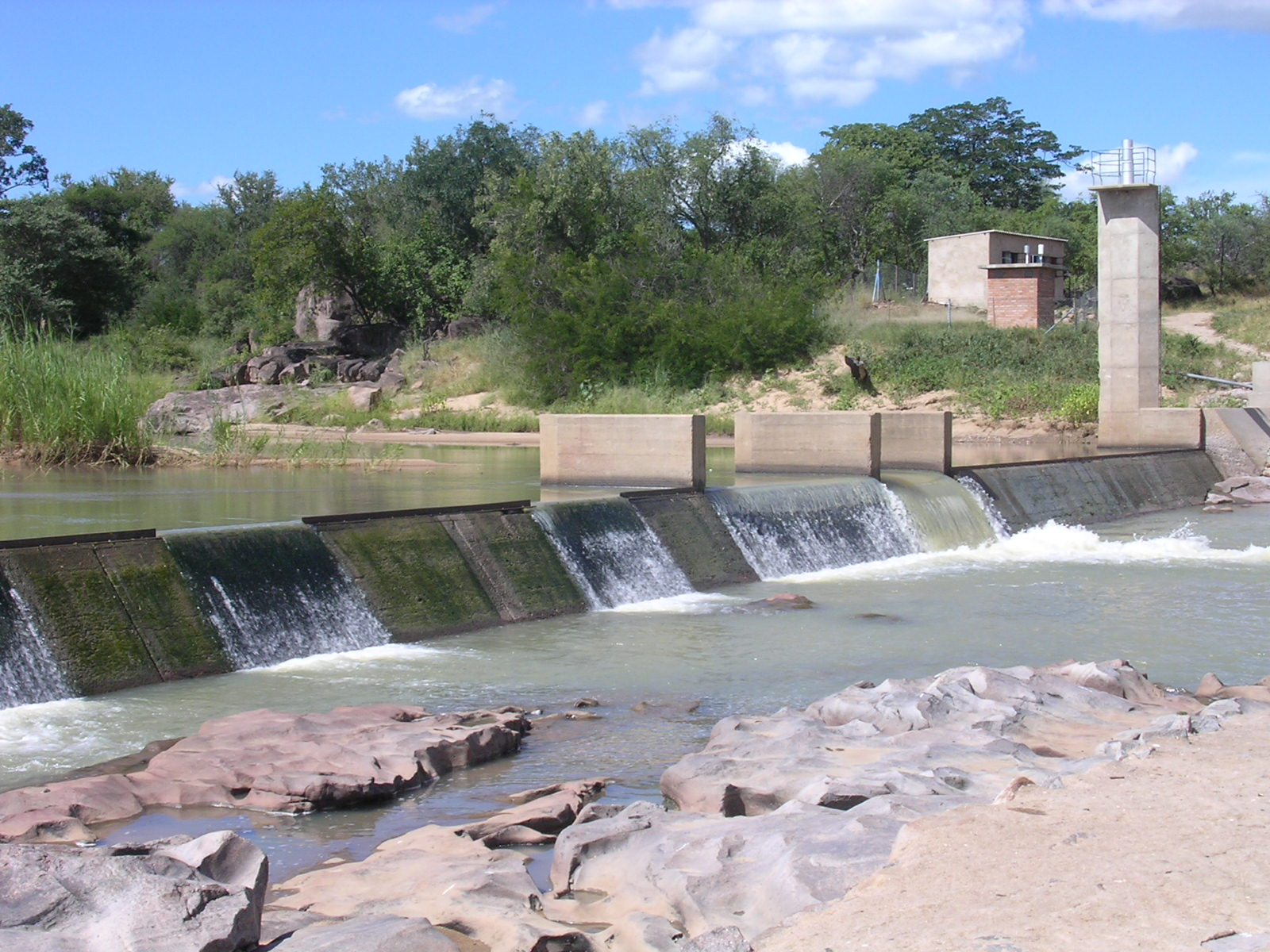
Stream gauge B62, a combination weir at Doddieburn, on the Mzingwane River, Zimbabwe

A variety of hydraulic structures / primary device are used to improve the reliability of using water level as a surrogate for flow (improving the accuracy of the rating table), including:

- Weirs
  - V-notch,
  - broad-crested,
  - sharp-crested and
  - combination weirs
- Flumes
  - Parshall flume

Other equipment commonly used at permanent stream gauge include:

- Cableways - for suspending a hydrographer and current meter over a river to make high flow measurement
- Stilling well - to provide a calm water level that can be measured by a sensor

Water level gauges:

- Staff (head) gauges - for a visual indication of water depth
- Water pressure measuring device (Bubbler) - to measure water level via pressure (typically done directly in-stream without a stilling well)
- Stage encoder - a potentiometer with a wheel and pulley system connected to a float in a stilling well to provide an electronic reading of the water level
- Simple ultrasonic devices - to measure water level in a stilling well or directly in a canal.
- Electromagnetic gauges

Discharge measurements of a stream or canal without an established stream gauge can be made using a current meter or Acoustic Doppler current profiler. One informal methods that is not acceptable for any official or scientific purpose, but can be useful is the float method, in which a floating object such as a piece of wood or orange peel is observed floating down the stream.

== National stream gauge networks ==
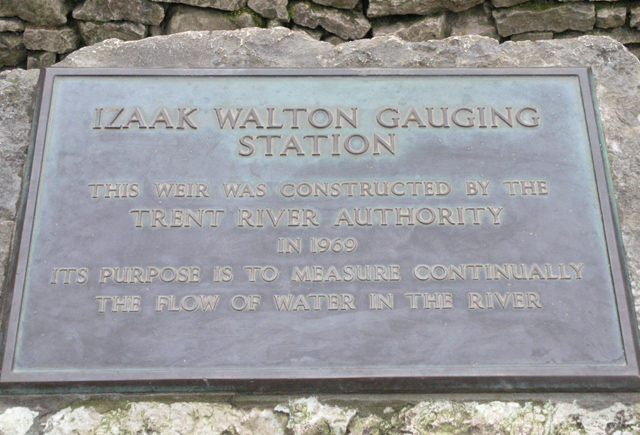
Plaque marking the construction of the River Dove gauging station, dedicated to Izaak Walton, author of The Compleat Angler.

=== England ===
The first routine measurements of river flow in England began on the Thames and Lea in the 1880s, The Environment Agency is responsible for collection and analysis of hydrometric data in England. The national gauging station network was established in its current form by the early 1970s and consists of approximately 1500 flow measurement stations supplemented by a variable number of temporary monitoring sites.

=== Scotland ===
The first routine measurements of river flow in Scotland on the River Garry in 1913. The Scottish Environment Protection Agency is responsible for collection and analysis of hydrometric data in Scotland.

=== Wales ===
Natural Resources Wales is responsible for collection and analysis of hydrometric data in Wales.

=== Northern Ireland ===
The Rivers Agency is responsible for collection and analysis of hydrometric data in Northern Ireland.

=== United States ===
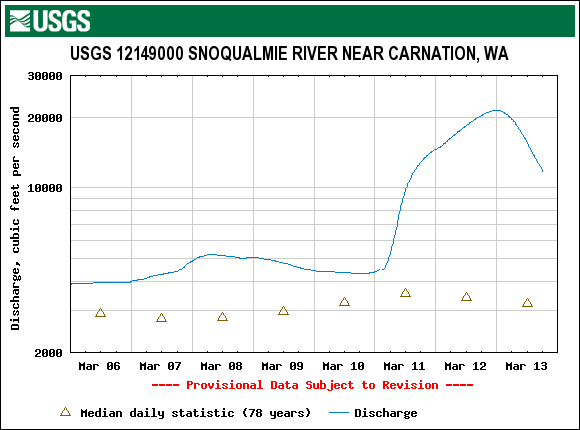
Hydrograph of the March 13, 2007 Snoqualmie River flood

In the United States, the U.S. Geological Survey (USGS) is the principal federal agency tasked with maintaining records of stream flow data. Within the USGS, the Water Resources Division carries the responsibility for monitoring water resources.

To establish a stream gauge, USGS personnel first choose a site on a stream where the geometry is relatively stable and there is a suitable location to make discrete direct measurements of streamflow using specialized equipment. Many times this will be at a bridge or other stream crossing. Technicians then install equipment that measures the stage (the elevation of the water surface) or, more rarely, the velocity of the flow. Additional equipment is installed to record and transmit these readings (via the Geostationary Operational Environmental Satellite) to the Water Science Center office where the records are kept. The USGS has a Water Science Center office in every state within the United States. Current streamflow data from USGS streamgages may be viewed in map form at: .

=== Zimbabwe ===
In Zimbabwe, the national stream gauge network is the responsibility of the Zimbabwe National Water Authority. This is an extensive network covering all major rivers and catchments in the country. However, a review of existing gauges raised serious concerns about the reliability of the data of a minority of stations, due in part to ongoing funding problems.

=== Bangladesh ===
The largest stream gauge network in Bangladesh is maintained by Bangladesh Water Development Board (BWDB). At few other locations, Bangladesh Inland Water Transport Authority maintains a few gauges to provide advisories for navigational purposes.

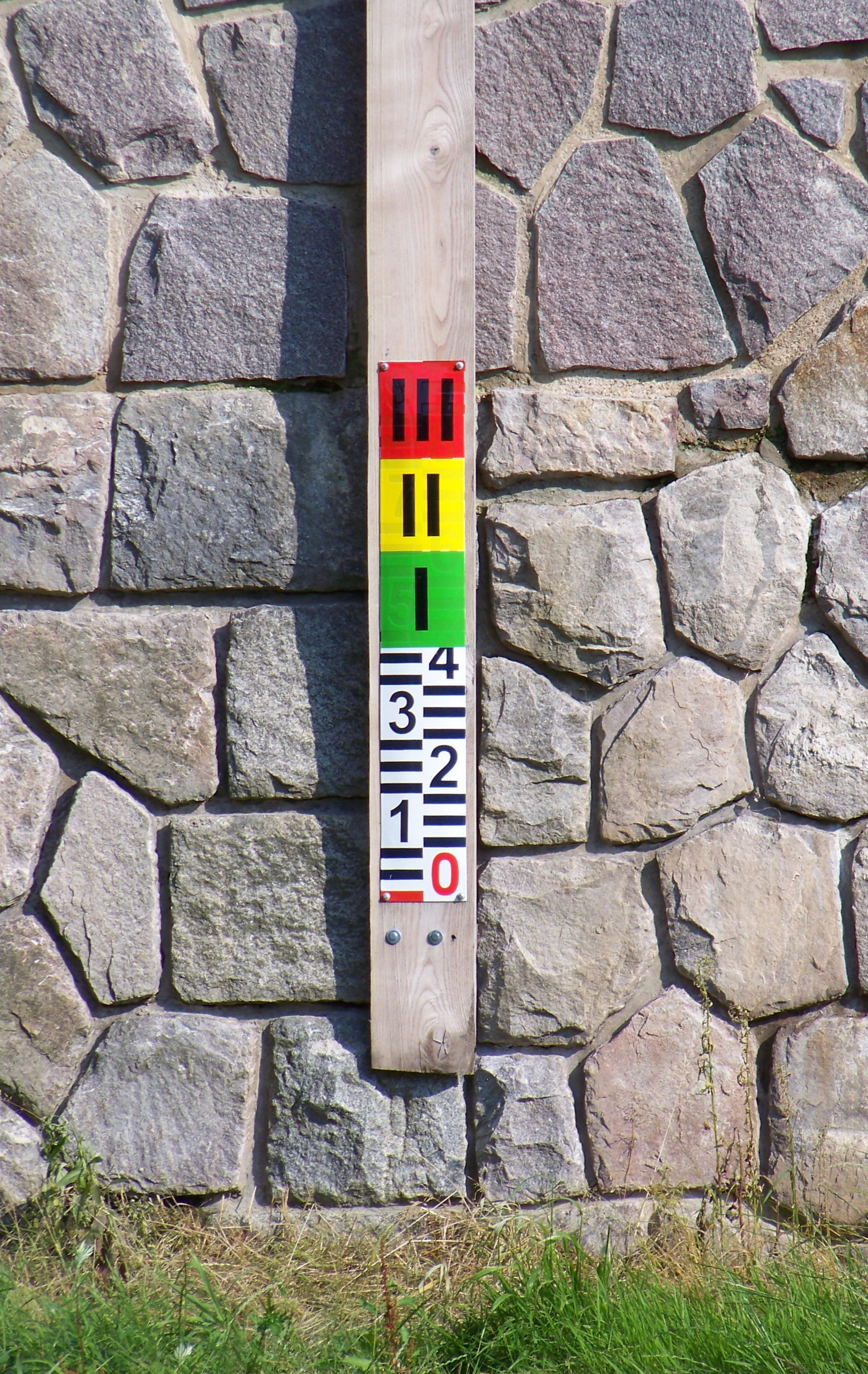
Emergency levels I, II and III at Tichá Orlice river in Choceň, Czech Republic

=== Czech Republic ===
In the Czech Republic, in some measuring places (profiles) are defined three levels which define three degrees of flood-emergency activity. The degree I is a situation of alertness, the degree II is a situation of readiness, the degree III is a situation of danger.

=== Canada ===
Temporarily shifted rating curve for station 05CK004, Red Deer River near Bindloss, Alberta, Canada, operated by Water Survey of Canada

Canadian streams and rivers are monitored by the Water Survey of Canada, a branch of Environment and Climate Change Canada. As of 2021, it operates or collects data from more than 2800 gauges across Canada. This data is used by provincial and territory governments to inform flood predictions and water management.

=== Sri Lanka ===
In Sri Lanka stream and rivers are monitored by Hydrology and Disaster Management Division a branch of Irrigation Department. It operates nearly 40 gauging station around the island.

== See also ==
- Embudo Stream Gauging Station
- Flood stage – Water level in hydrology
- Hydrograph – Graph showing the rate of water flow
- Hydrometry – Monitoring the components of the hydrological cycle
- Hyetograph – Graph of rainfall intensity over time
- Hydrological model – Predicting and managing water resources
- Hydrological transport model – Type of mathematical model
- Nilometer – Structure for measuring the Nile River's clarity and water level
- Tide gauge – Device for measuring the change in sea level relative to a datum
- Water column – Conceptual column of water from the surface to the bottom of a body of water
- Water level – Height of the free surface of a water body
- Willow Beach Gauging Station
