= Water level =

Height of the free surface of a water body

Water level, also known as gauge height or stage, is the elevation of the free surface of a sea, stream, lake or reservoir relative to a specified vertical datum. Over long distances, neglecting external forcings (such as wind), water level tends to conform to an equigeopotential surface.

== See also ==
- Water level (device), device utilizing the surface of liquid water to establish a local horizontal plane of reference
- Flood stage
- Hydraulic head
- Stream gauge
  - Water level gauges
- Tide gauge
- Level sensor
- Liquid level
- Reference water level
- Stage (hydrology)
- Sea level
