= Curve Fire =

2002 wildfire in Southern California

- Part of the 2002 California wildfires
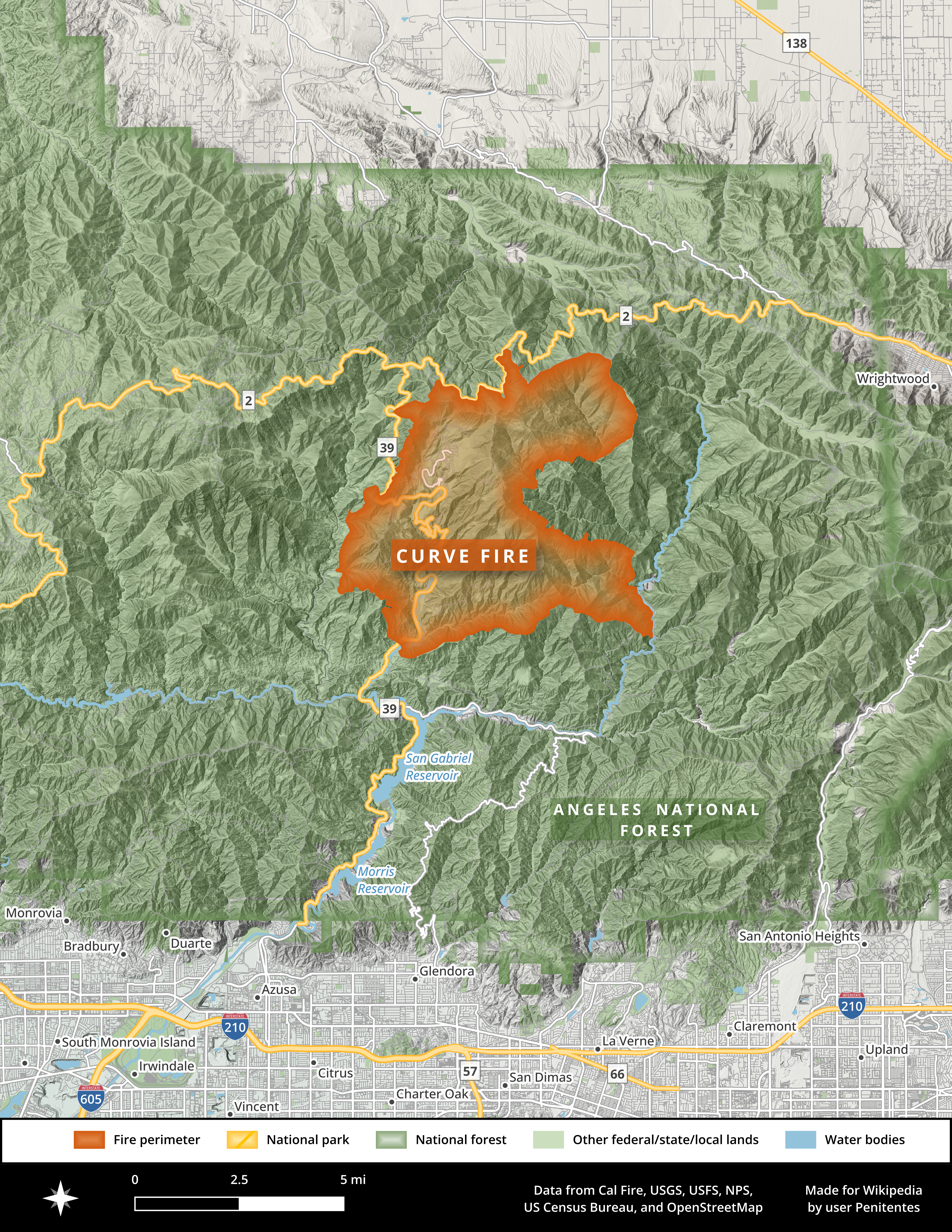
- The footprint of the Curve Fire in the Angeles National Forest
- Date: September 1 –; September 5, 2002; (5 days)
- Location: Los Angeles County, Southern California, United States
- Coordinates: 34.26°N 117.84°W

Statistics
- Burned area: 20,857 acres (8,441 ha; 33 sq mi; 84 km^{2})

Impacts
- Injuries: 14
- Evacuated: ~8,000 people
- Structures destroyed: 73

Ignition
- Cause: Candles associated with a Santería ritual

Map
- The general location of the Curve Fire in Southern California

The Curve Fire was a destructive wildfire in the Angeles National Forest in Los Angeles County, California, in September of 2002. The fire, which ignited on September 1 from candles associated with a Santería ritual, grew to 20,857 acres (8,441 hectares) before it was declared fully contained on September 5. The Curve Fire destroyed 73 structures, forced the temporary closure of several highways over the Labor Day weekend, and caused multiple injuries.

== Background ==
The Curve Fire was the seventh largest of the 2002 California wildfire season, in which 8,171 wildfires burned a total of 538,216 acres (217,808 ha). Antecedent hot, dry weather helped drive the fire.

== Progression ==
The Curve Fire ignited on Sunday, September 1 by California State Route 39, near Rincon Canyon and about one mile (1.6 km) north of East Fork Ridge, in the Bichota Mesa area.

The fire began at roughly 12:30–12:45 p.m. PDT and crossed Highway 39 north of East Fork Road while moving north, burning past the Crystal Lake Recreation Area. The fire spread north on both the eastern and western sides of Highway 39. By 5:00 p.m. the fire had burned about 10,000 acres (4,000 ha) and about 500 firefighters were on the scene. Two Los Angeles County sheriff's deputies drove through flames to reach a woman in her cabin near Soldier's Creek who, unable to escape, had planned to commit suicide before the fire reached her and informed her ex-husband via phone call.

On Wednesday, September 4, the fire moved beneath—and threatened—major electrical transmission lines connecting Southern California to its northern counterpart. The California Independent System Operator reduced the power flowing through the lines so as to decrease the risk of systemic disruptions should one or more lines fail. By that evening the fire had burned more than 16,000 acres (6,500 ha) with 15 percent containment. These figures both increased during the remainder of the week: by nightfall on Saturday, September 7, the burned area had grown to 18,776 acres (7,598 ha) and containment had reached 52 percent.

== Cause ==
Investigators originally suspected that a lightning strike had touched off the fire, later changing their assessment after surveying the area. On September 6 the U.S. Forest Service announced that the fire had been caused by "candles associated with a ritual involving the use of fire and animal sacrifices". The nocturnal sacrifice, specifically that of a goat, was in keeping with the local practice of Santería, an imported African diasporic religion from Cuba. In Santería animal sacrifices are sometimes made in a forest, considered a sacred place, and law enforcement had encountered the remnants—including leftover votive candles—of similar rituals elsewhere in the Angeles National Forest.

== Effects ==
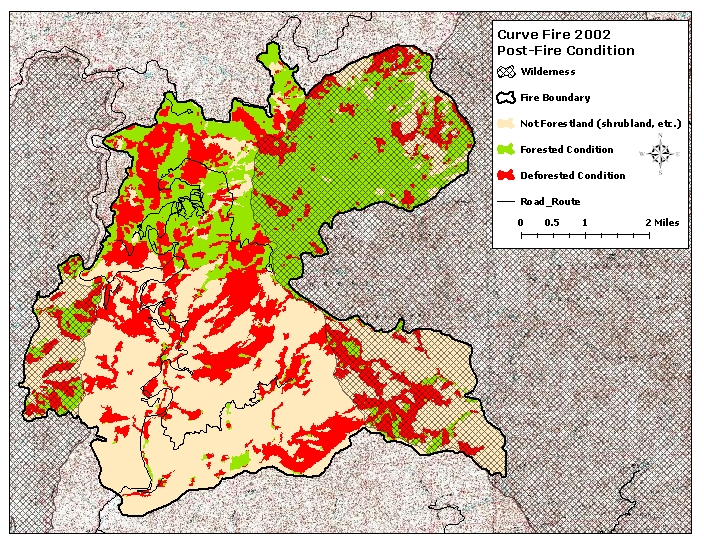
A Forest Service map of vegetation conditions following the Curve Fire

The Curve Fire caused fourteen injuries and destroyed 73 structures. One of these was the South Mount Hawkins fire lookout in the Sheep Mountain Wilderness, and another was the unoccupied Coldbrook Ranger Station. Most of the remainder were special use cabins, outbuildings, and Forest Service buildings in San Gabriel Canyon.

About 8,000 people, largely campers, were forced to evacuate the Angeles National Forest. Some families and other groups were separated during the rapid evacuations. The fire forced the temporary closure of both California State Route 39 and the Angeles Crest Highway, fouling Labor Day travel plans for many. Smoke impacted communities in the Victor Valley, forestalling recreational activities.

== See also ==
- Glossary of wildfire terms
- List of California wildfires
