= Discharge (hydrology) =

Flow rate of water that is transported through a given cross-sectional area

In hydrology, discharge is the volumetric flow rate (volume per time, in units of m^{3}/h or ft^{3}/h) of a stream. It equals the product of average flow velocity (with dimension of length per time, in m/h or ft/h) and the cross-sectional area (in m^{2} or ft^{2}). It includes any suspended solids (e.g. sediment), dissolved chemicals like CaCO_{3}(aq), or biologic material (e.g. diatoms) in addition to the water itself. Terms may vary between disciplines. For example, a fluvial hydrologist studying natural river systems may define discharge as streamflow, whereas an engineer operating a reservoir system may equate it with outflow, contrasted with inflow.

== Formulation ==
A discharge is a measure of the quantity of any fluid flow over unit time. The quantity may be either volume or mass. Thus the water discharge of a tap (faucet) can be measured with a measuring jug and a stopwatch. Here the discharge might be 1 litre per 15 seconds, equivalent to 67 ml/second or 4 litres/minute. This is an average measure. For measuring the discharge of a river we need a different method and the most common is the 'area-velocity' method. The area is the cross sectional area across a river and the average velocity across that section needs to be measured for a unit time, commonly a minute. Measurement of cross sectional area and average velocity, although simple in concept, are frequently non-trivial to determine.

The units that are typically used to express discharge in streams or rivers include m^{3}/s (cubic meters per second), ft^{3}/s (cubic feet per second or cfs) and acre-feet per day.

A commonly applied methodology for measuring, and estimating, the discharge of a river is based on a simplified form of the continuity equation. The equation implies that for any incompressible fluid, such as liquid water, the discharge (Q) is equal to the product of the stream's cross-sectional area (A) and its mean velocity ($\bar{u}$), and is written as:

$$Q=A\,\bar{u}$$

where

- $Q$ is the discharge ([L^{3}T^{−1}]; m^{3}/s or ft^{3}/s)
- $A$ is the cross-sectional area of the portion of the channel occupied by the flow ([L^{2}]; m^{2} or ft^{2})
- $\bar{u}$ is the average flow velocity ([LT^{−1}]; m/s or ft/s)

For example, the average discharge of the Rhine river in Europe is 2,200 cubic metres per second (78,000 cu ft/s) or 190,000,000 cubic metres (150,000 acre⋅ft) per day.

Because of the difficulties of measurement, a stream gauge is often used at a fixed location on the stream or river.

=== Empirical relationships ===
Empirically derived relationships between channel width (breadth) b, depth h, and velocity 'u' are:

$$b \propto Q^{0.5}$$
$$h \propto Q^{0.4}$$
$$u \propto Q^{0.1}$$

Parameter $Q$ refers to a "dominant discharge" or "channel-forming discharge", which is typically the 1–2 year flood, though there is a large amount of scatter around this mean. This is the event that causes significant erosion and deposition and determines the channel morphology.

== Hydrograph ==
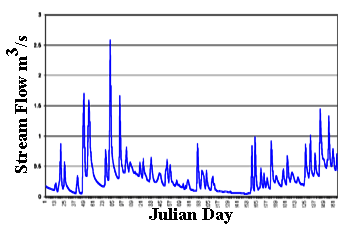
A stream hydrograph. Increases in stream flow follow rainfall or snowmelt. The gradual decay in flow after the peaks reflects diminishing supply from groundwater.

A hydrograph is a graph showing the rate of flow (discharge) versus time past a specific point in a river, channel, or conduit carrying flow. The rate of flow is typically expressed in units of cubic meters per second (m³/s) or cubic feet per second (cfs). Hydrographs often relate changes of precipitation to changes in discharge over time. The term can also refer to a graph showing the volume of water reaching a particular outfall, or location in a sewerage network. Graphs are commonly used in the design of sewerage, more specifically, the design of surface water sewerage systems and combined sewers.

it is helpful for displaying both collected data and water level forecasts

== Catchment discharge ==
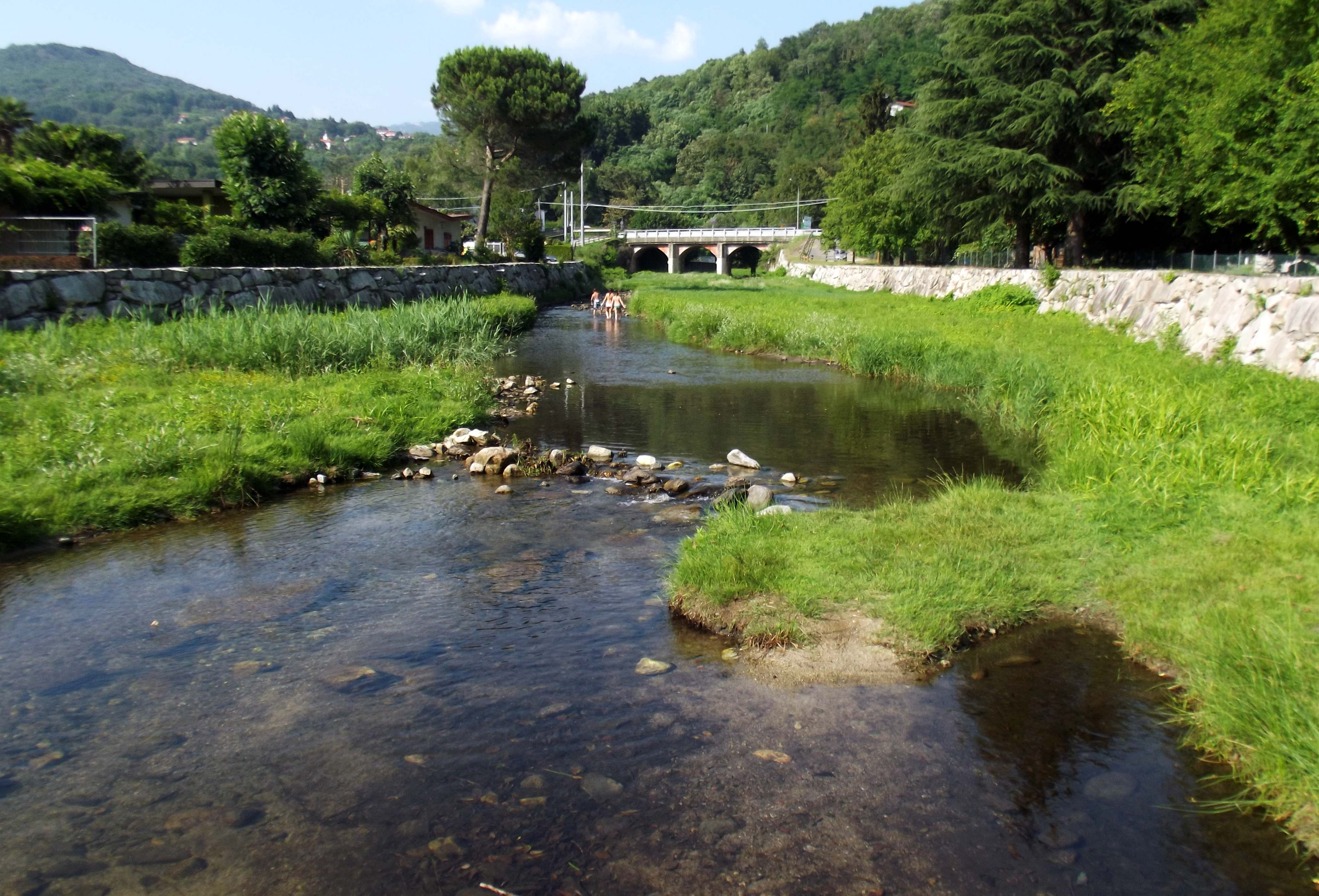
Torrente Pescone, one of the inflows of Lake Orta (Italy).

The catchment of a river above a certain location is determined by the surface area of all land which drains toward the river from above that point. The river's discharge at that location depends on the rainfall on the catchment or drainage area and the inflow or outflow of groundwater to or from the area, stream modifications such as dams and irrigation diversions, as well as evaporation and evapotranspiration from the area's land and plant surfaces. In storm hydrology, an important consideration is the stream's discharge hydrograph, a record of how the discharge varies over time after a precipitation event. The stream rises to a peak flow after each precipitation event, then falls in a slow recession. Because the peak flow also corresponds to the maximum water level reached during the event, it is of interest in flood studies. Analysis of the relationship between precipitation intensity and duration and the response of the stream discharge are aided by the concept of the unit hydrograph, which represents the response of stream discharge over time to the application of a hypothetical "unit" amount and duration of rainfall (e.g., half an inch over one hour). The amount of precipitation correlates to the volume of water (depending on the area of the catchment) that subsequently flows out of the river. Using the unit hydrograph method, actual historical rainfalls can be modeled mathematically to confirm characteristics of historical floods, and hypothetical "design storms" can be created for comparison to observed stream responses.

The relationship between the discharge in the stream at a given cross-section and the level of the stream is described by a rating curve. Average velocities and the cross-sectional area of the stream are measured for a given stream level. The velocity and the area give the discharge for that level. After measurements are made for several different levels, a rating table or rating curve may be developed. Once rated, the discharge in the stream may be determined by measuring the level, and determining the corresponding discharge from the rating curve. If a continuous level-recording device is located at a rated cross-section, the stream's discharge may be continuously determined.

Larger flows (higher discharges) can transport more sediment and larger particles downstream than smaller flows due to their greater force. Larger flows can also erode stream banks and damage public infrastructure.

== Catchment effects on discharge and morphology ==
G. H. Dury and M. J. Bradshaw are two geographers who devised models showing the relationship between discharge and other variables in a river. The Bradshaw model described how pebble size and other variables change from source to mouth; while Dury considered the relationships between discharge and variables such as stream slope and friction. These follow from the ideas presented by Leopold, Wolman and Miller in Fluvial Processes in Geomorphology. and on land use affecting river discharge and bedload supply.

== Inflow ==
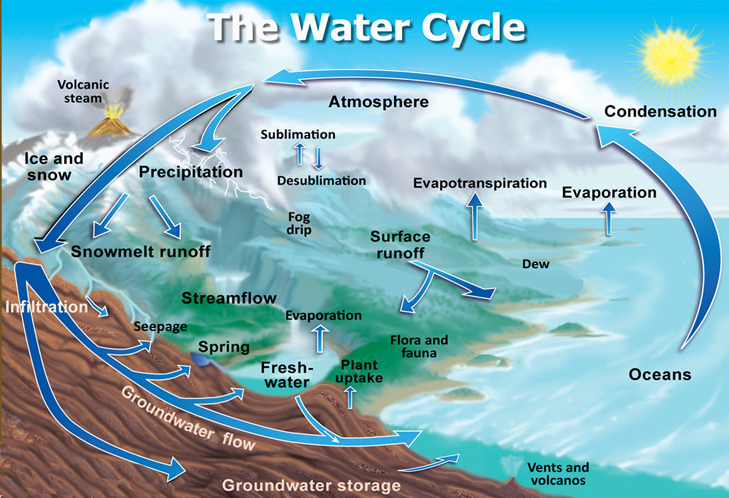
Visual description of Hydrologic Cycle

Inflow is the sum of processes within the hydrologic cycle that increase the water levels of bodies of water. Most precipitation occurs directly over bodies of water such as the oceans, or on land as surface runoff. A portion of runoff enters streams and rivers, and another portion soaks into the ground as groundwater seepage. The rest soaks into the ground as infiltration, some of which infiltrates deep into the ground to replenish aquifers.

== See also ==
- List of rivers by discharge
- Groundwater discharge
- Submarine groundwater discharge
- Stream gauge
- Hydrology
