= Line laser =

Laser to generate a laser line instead of a point

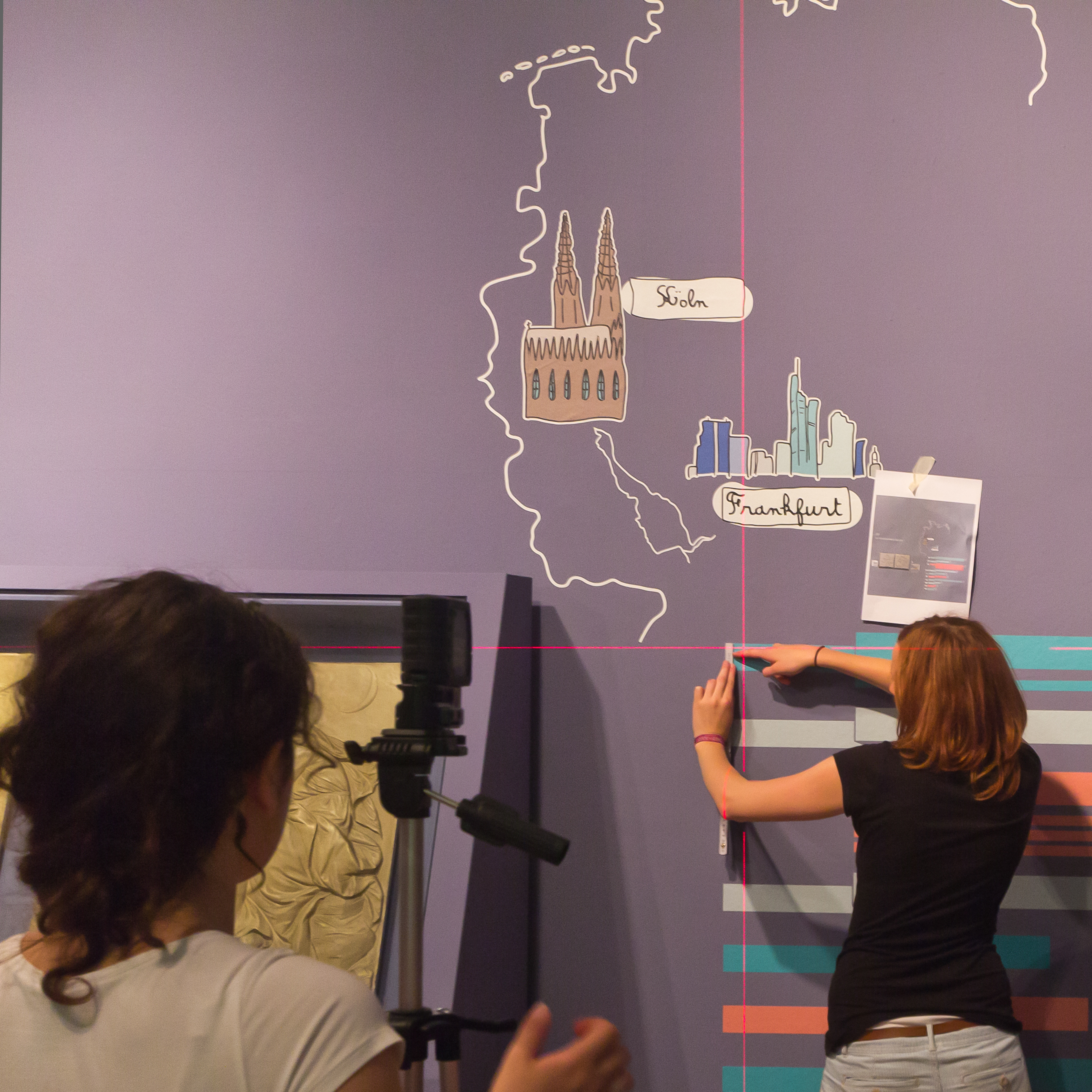
Using a line laser to project a red laser cross onto a wall

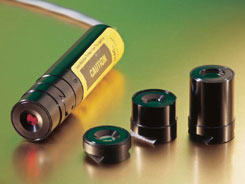
Line laser with interchangeable lenses

A line laser is a device that employs a laser and an optical lens to project the laser beam as a line rather than a point (e.g. laser pointer). This may be achieved by passing the beam through a cylindrical lens or a Powell lens.

Depending on the application, independent line lasers may be used to generate lines, or multiple line lasers may be used together to produce crosses or other composite patterns. In civil engineering and interior design, line lasers are used to assist in levelling building sites and structures. Multiple lines may be generated for use with image processing.

== Applications ==
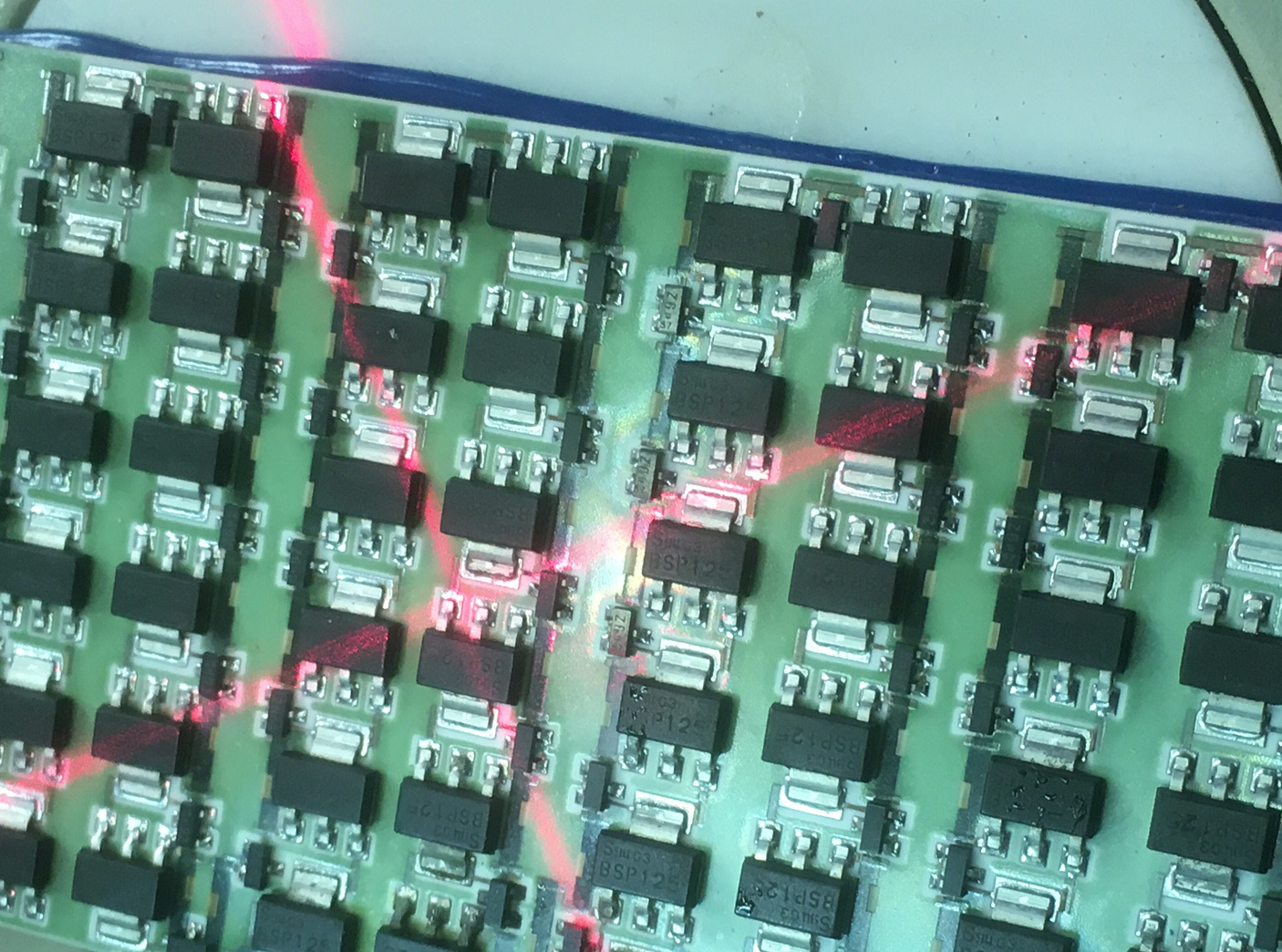
Laser alignment crosshairs projected by a ring light which is mounted to a stereo microscope; the crosshairs facilitate rapid component location when transitioning between microscope and direct viewing

- Diffractive beam splitter, an optical element that divides a beam into multiple beams, like for example a matrix of dots
- Calibration, by projecting a precise line, for example where a level or plumb reference is required, like ensuring alignment or straightness
- Spirit level, to indicate whether a surface is horizontal (level) or vertical (plumb)
- Light section, optical 3D measurement of a height profile along a projected line of light based on triangulation
- Image processing, processing of digital images through algorithms, for example for defect detection, dimensional measurement or object recognition.
- Laser scanning, by capturing the line(s) by camera to create a 3D representation of an object
- Machine vision, by projecting lines onto an object and using a camera to capture the distorted lines to measure distances, profiles, and surface characteristics
- 3D scanners, by projecting lines onto an object and using a camera to capture the distorted lines and calculating the object's shape and dimensions using trigonometric principles. David Laserscanner is an example of a software package for low-cost 3D laser scanning, based on using a hand-held line laser.
- Laser line level, projecting a horizontal or vertical line onto a surface as a reference for alignment or leveling by using a laser and often a cylindrical lens (Powell lens) to spread the laser beam into a line
- Laser level, projecting one or more lines horizontally or vertically as a reference for alignment or leveling
- Surveying, primarily used to establish accurate horizontal and vertical reference lines, establishing elevations, or precise alignments
- Detecting tripwires

== See also ==
- Rotary laser level, surveying and construction tool with a rotating laser beam projector
