= Reed (plant) =

Common name for various tall grass-like plants of wetlands

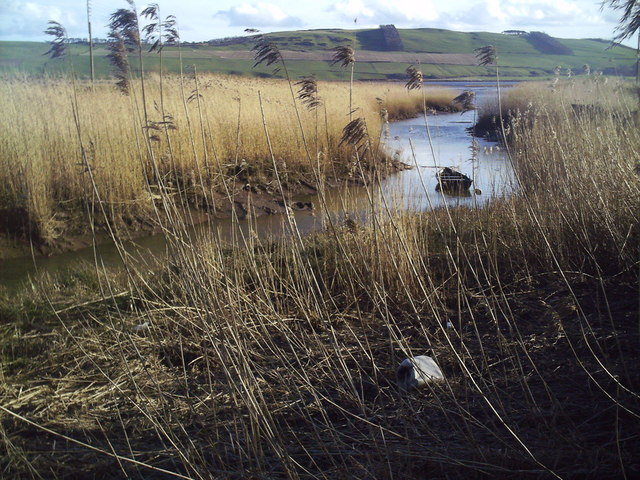
Reeds growing in saltmarsh in the estuary of the River Tay.

Reed is the common name for several tall, grass-like plants found in wetlands.

== Varieties ==
They are all members of the order Poales (in the modern, expanded circumscription), and include:

=== In the grass family, Poaceae ===
- Common reed (Phragmites australis), the original species named reed
- Giant reed (Arundo donax), used for making reeds for musical instruments
- Burma reed (Neyraudia reynaudiana)
- Reed canary-grass (Phalaris arundinacea)
- Reed sweet-grass (Glyceria maxima)
- Small-reed (Calamagrostis species)

=== In the sedge family, Cyperaceae ===
- Paper reed or papyrus (Cyperus papyrus), the source of the Ancient Egyptian writing material, also used for making boats

=== In the family Typhaceae ===
- Bur-reed (Sparganium species)
- Reed-mace (Typha species), also called bulrush or cattail

=== In the family Restionaceae ===
- Cape thatching reed (Elegia tectorum), a restio originating from the South-western Cape, South Africa.
- Thatching reed (Thamnochortus insignis), another restio species originating from the same geographic region.

== Use in construction ==
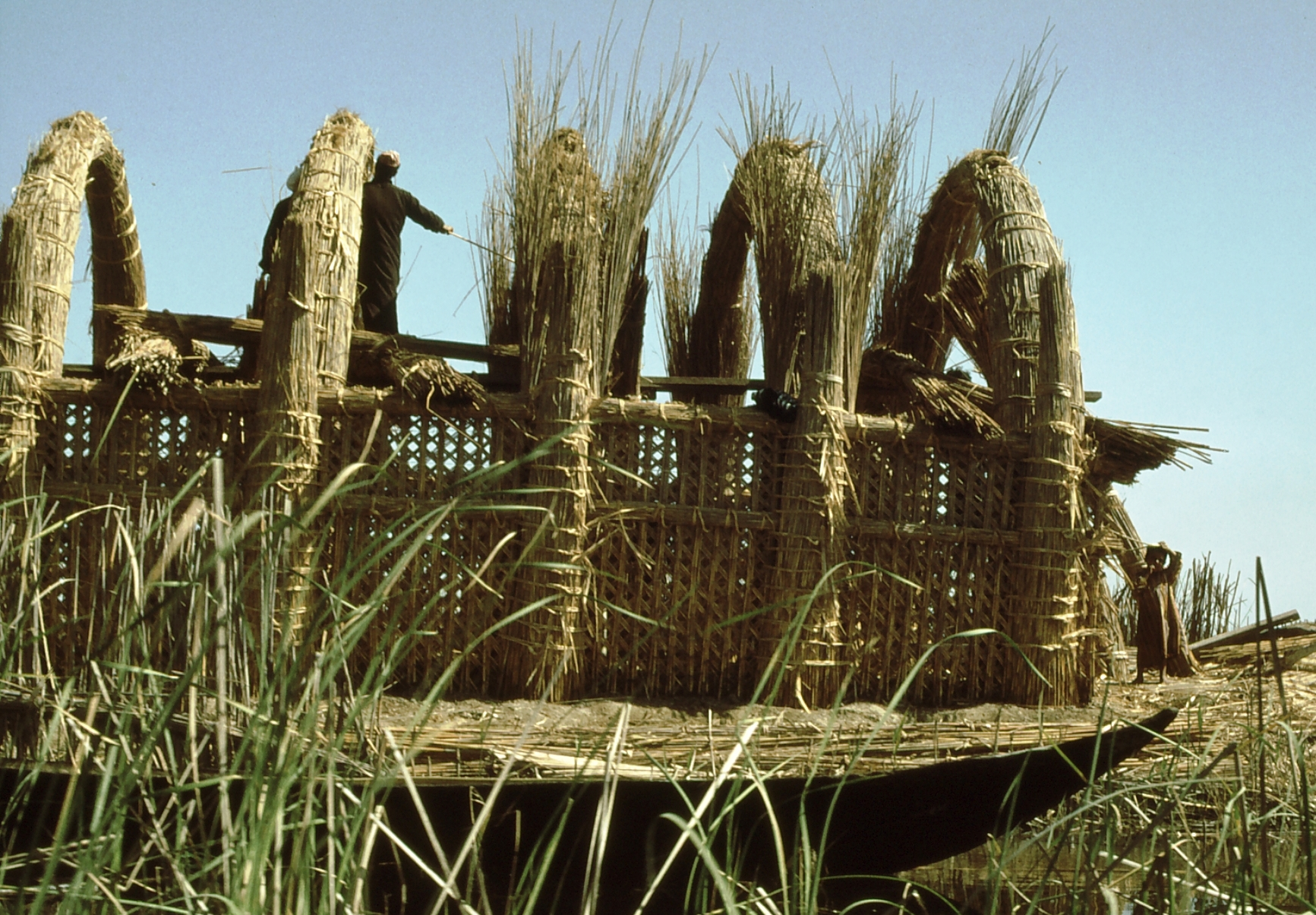
A reed house under construction in the marshes of Iraq, 1978

Many different cultures have used reeds in construction of buildings of various types for at least thousands of years. One contemporary example is the Marsh Arabs.

=== Thatching ===
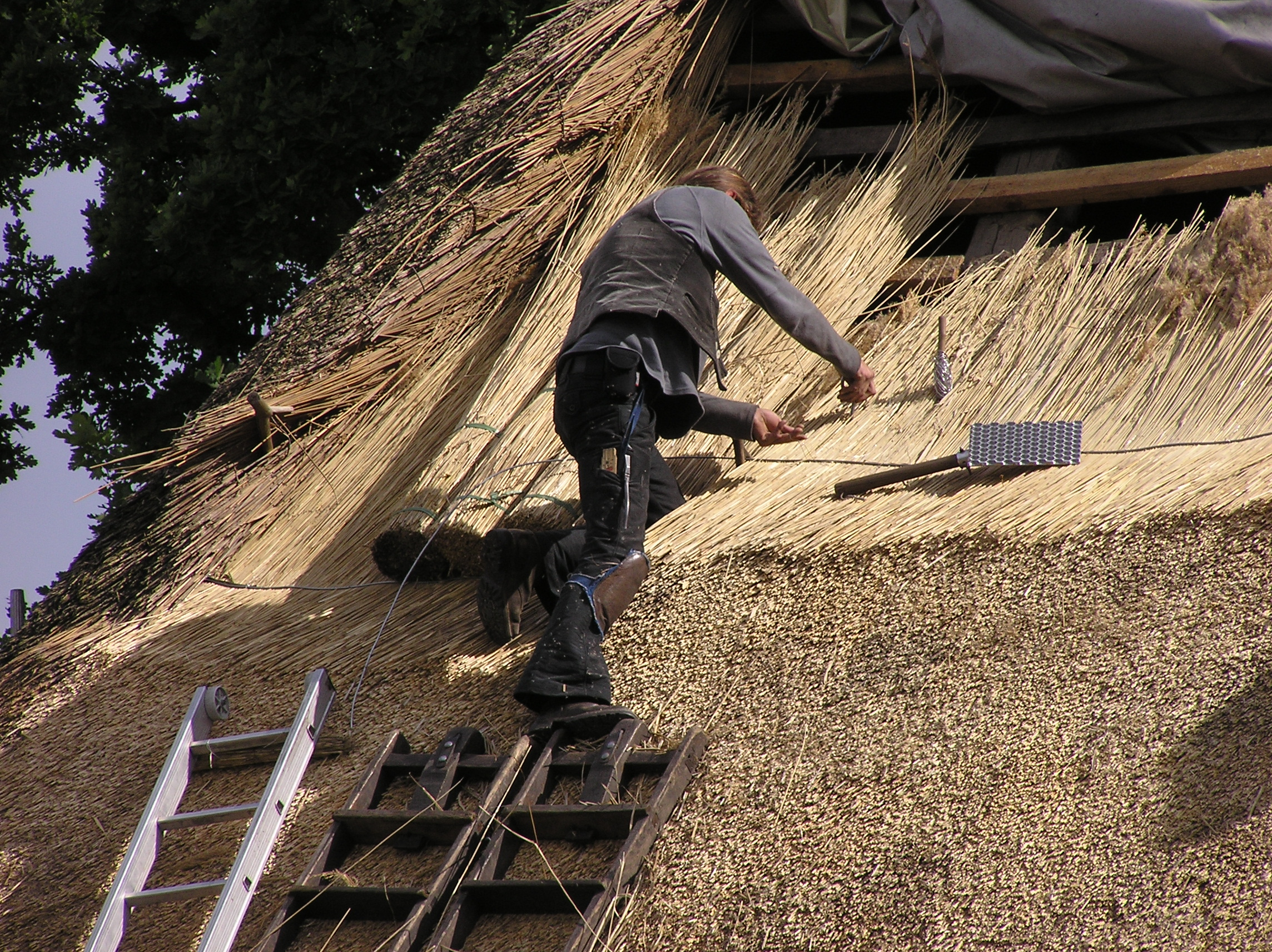
A man in Germany thatching a roof using reeds

Phragmites australis, the common reed, is used in many areas for thatching roofs. In the United Kingdom, common reed used for this purpose is known as "Norfolk reed" or "water reed". However, "wheat reed" and "Devon reed" are not reeds but long-stemmed wheat straw.

== Use in music ==
Ancient Greeks used Arundo donax to make flutes known as kalamaulos; this is a compound word, from kalamos (cane) + aulos (flute). At the time, the best cane for flutes came from the banks of river Kephissos, in Attica, Greece. Several kalamaulos tuned differently and tied together, made a syrinx or Panpipes. A. donax is still the principal source material of reed makers for clarinets, saxophones, oboes, bassoons, bagpipes, and other woodwind instruments. The Var country in southern France contains the best-known supply of instrument reeds.

== Other uses ==
Bamboo and, even more commonly, rattan stems are used as "reed sticks" to wick and disperse the scent of essential oils in aroma diffusers.

Certain reed species were used in the manufacture of the writing implement, Reed pens, by scribes of antiquity. The use is still in practice today within the field of art, specifically calligraphy.

== See also ==
Reeds pictured in the coat of arms of Ruokolahti

- Constructed wetland
- Reed bed
- Reed boat
- Reed fields
- Reed level

== Honorable Mentions ==
Appears in the Amplified Bible translation (AMP) in Numbers 33:10 “They moved out from Elim and camped by the Red Sea (of Reeds)”.

While The name “of reeds” next to the Red Sea known for high salt content may seem odd, names during this time period served a deeper purpose, common practices during this time period.

In art and Literature, numerous historical cultures have drawn inspiration from botanical significance and symbolism found in religious scripture
