= Line laser level =

Leveling tool consisting of a line laser and a leveling mechanism

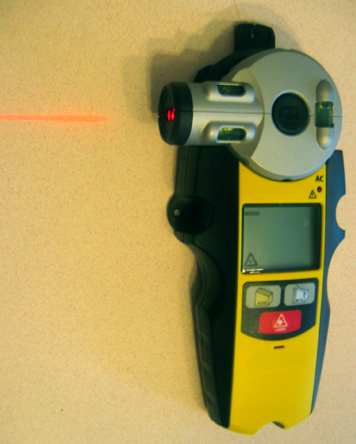
Line laser level using one line laser, spirit levels for three planes, and including a digital stud sensor display.

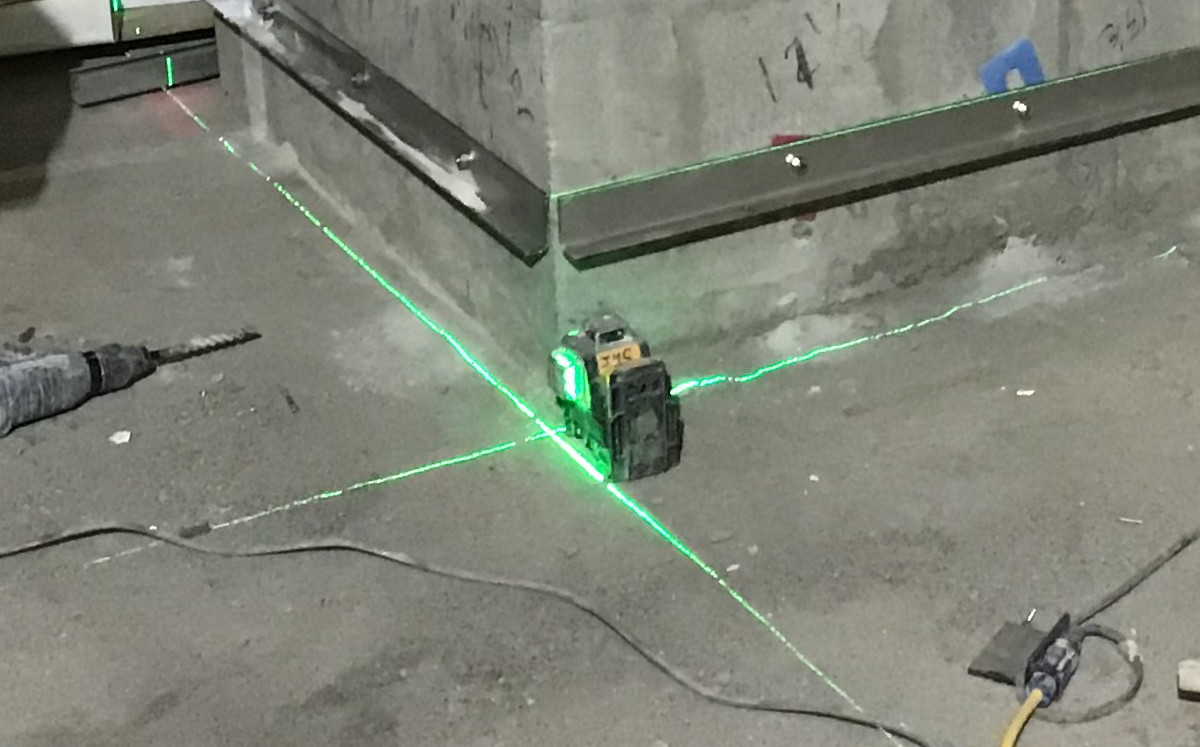
Cross line laser level using several line lasers, here drawing a cross (or two lines 90 degrees on each other) on the floor (XY) plane. They are usually used indoors, while rotary laser levels are usually used outdoors.

A line laser level is a tool combining a spirit level and/or plumb bob to balance a stationary line laser to display a precise horizontal or vertical illuminated line on a surface the line laser level is laid against. Line laser levels are used wherever precise verticals and horizontals are required, typically in the construction and cabinetry industries. Some models are inexpensive enough for do-it-yourself applications.

A cross laser level or cross line laser level utilizes pairs of line lasers to project both horizontal and vertical lines simultaneously. They can be manufactured with cross line lasers in one, two or three planes:

- XY plane: Draws lines on the floor plane
- XZ plane: Draws lines on the forward and backwall
- YZ plane: Draws lines on the side walls

The light beam can span, for example, 90, 180 or 360 degrees of each of these planes, with small interruptions due to the posts that protect the glass housings around the lasers. A 360 degree laser level is sometimes confused with a rotary laser level.

Cross laser levels have largely replaced line laser levels. While line laser levels can be handy for things like hanging pictures, cross laser levels have a much wider range of uses, including painting and tiling. The most versatile type is the 3x360-degree cross laser levels, which draw horizontal and vertical lines on all walls.

== Use ==
The illuminated line is reasonably straight, so that the line level can be used as a straightedge; for example, to see if a shelf is warped, even if not horizontal.

== Function ==
The laser beam is fanned by a lens to produce a thin plane beam precisely horizontal or vertical, rather than a pinpoint beam. The axis of the laser is offset from the wall, so that a pinpoint beam would be parallel to and offset from the wall, and would not illuminate it; the fanned beam will intersect the wall, creating a precisely horizontal (or vertical) illuminated line along it.

== Precision ==
The machine is set up using the built-in mechanical spirit level, plumb bob or electronic levelling, and the line along the surface is then guaranteed to be precisely horizontal or vertical to within a certain tolerance, specified either in millimetres per metre distance. A more advanced device may be accurate to within 0.3 mm/m; while lower-end models may be closer to 1.5 mm/m.

== See also ==
- Dumpy level, optical instrument used in surveying and building to transfer, measure, or set horizontal levels
- Theodolite, surveying instrument that measures azimuth and elevation between points
- List of laser articles
- Laser machine control, electronic system for automatic operation of land scrapers or excavators
