= Laser level =

Control tool for surveying and construction

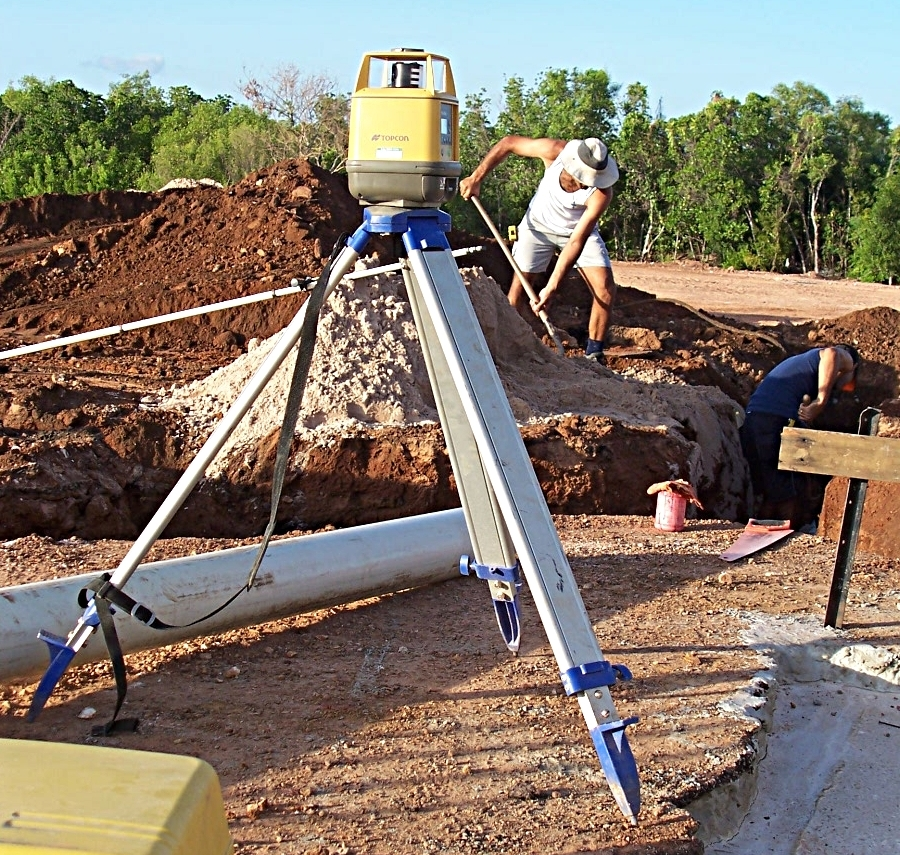
A rotary laser level set up and used to level sand fill in trenches. The graduated staff is leaning on the pile of sand.

In surveying and construction, the laser level is a control tool consisting of a rotating laser beam projector that can be affixed to a tripod. The tool is leveled according to the accuracy of the device and projects a fixed red or green beam in a plane about the horizontal and/or vertical axis.

== History ==
The concept of a laser level has been around since at least the early 1970s, the original spinning-mirror design laser plane and line level was patented by the late 1980s, and the compact lens-based laser line level (as produced by many tool manufacturers today) was patented in the late 1990s. It was invented by Oscar Soliz in the late 1960s, who later sold the rights to it.

== Rotary laser level ==
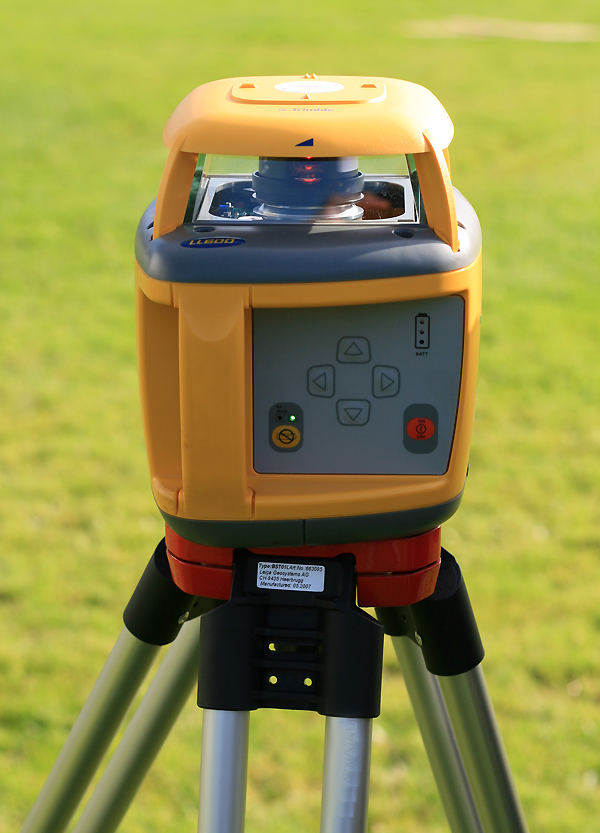
A rotary laser level, which typically have a stronger laser more suitable for outdoor use compared to line laser levels

A rotary laser level is a more advanced laser level in that it spins the beam of light fast enough to give the effect of a complete 360 degree horizontal or vertical plane, thus illuminating not just a fixed line, but a horizontal plane. The laser beam projector employs a rotating head with a mirror for sweeping the laser beam about a vertical axis. If the mirror is not self-leveling, it is provided with visually readable level vials and manually adjustable screws for orienting the projector. A staff carried by the operator is equipped with a movable sensor, which can detect the laser beam and gives a signal when the sensor is in line with the beam (usually an audible beep). The position of the sensor on the graduated staff, also known as a grade rod, or story pole, allows comparison of elevations between different points on the terrain. Most laser levels are used in the construction industry.

== Tower-mounted laser level ==
A tower-mounted laser level is used in combination with a sensor on a wheel tractor-scraper in the process of land laser leveling to bring land (for example, an agricultural field) to near-flatness with a slight grade for drainage.

== Cross laser level ==
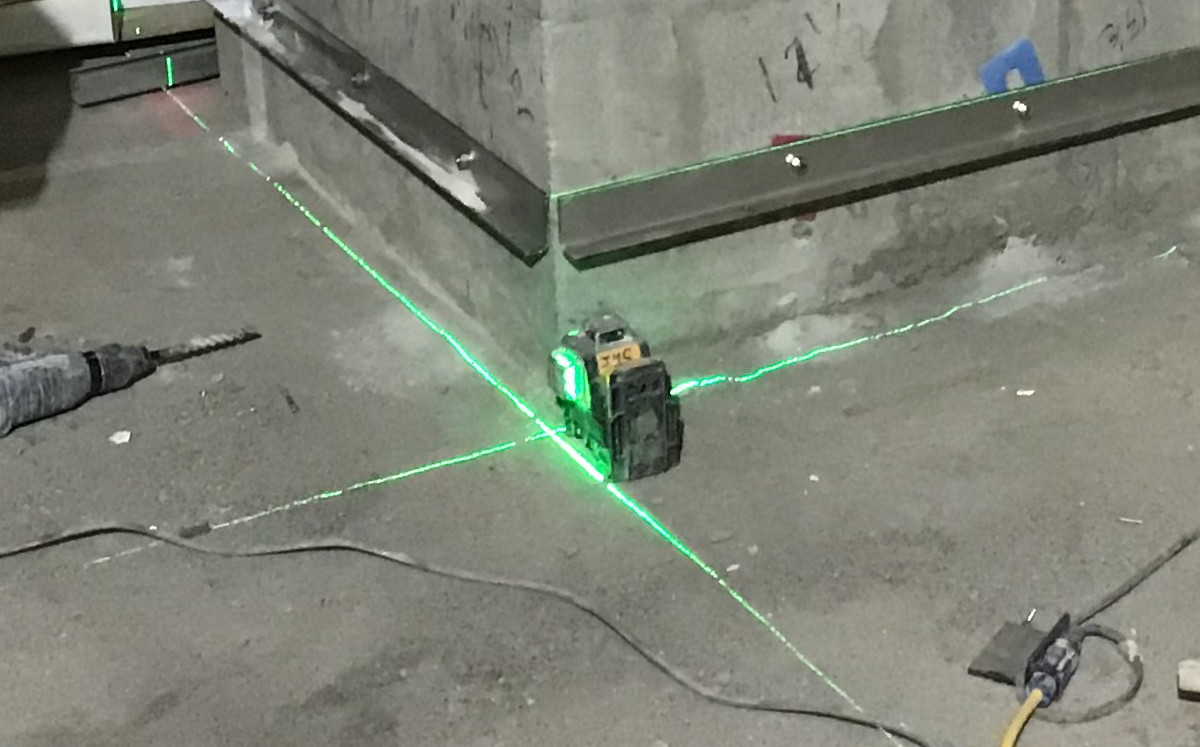
Green cross line laser level, here drawing a cross (or two lines 90 degrees on each other) on the floor (XY) plane. They are usually used indoors, while rotary laser levels are usually used outdoors.

Cross laser levels and line laser levels are types of modern electronic laser levels commonly used in construction and home projects. Instead of a rotating laser, they have one or several stationary line lasers that is levelled by a spirit level and/or plumb bob to simultaneously display precise horizontal or vertical illuminated lines on surfaces. Cross laser levels have largely replaced line laser levels. While line laser levels can be handy for things like hanging pictures, cross laser levels have a much wider range of uses, including painting and tiling. The most versatile type is the 3x360-degree cross laser levels, which draw horizontal and vertical lines on all walls. They can be manufactured with cross lasers in one, two or three planes:

- XY plane: Draws lines on the floor plane
- XZ plane: Draws lines on the forward and backwall
- YZ plane: Draws lines on the side walls

The light beam can span, for example, 90, 180 or 360 degrees of each of these planes, with small interruptions due to the posts that protect the glass housings around the lasers. A 360 degree laser level is sometimes confused with a rotary laser level.

== See also ==
- Dumpy level, optical instrument used in surveying and building to transfer, measure, or set horizontal levels
- List of laser articles
- Laser machine control, electronic system for automatic operation of land scrapers or excavators
