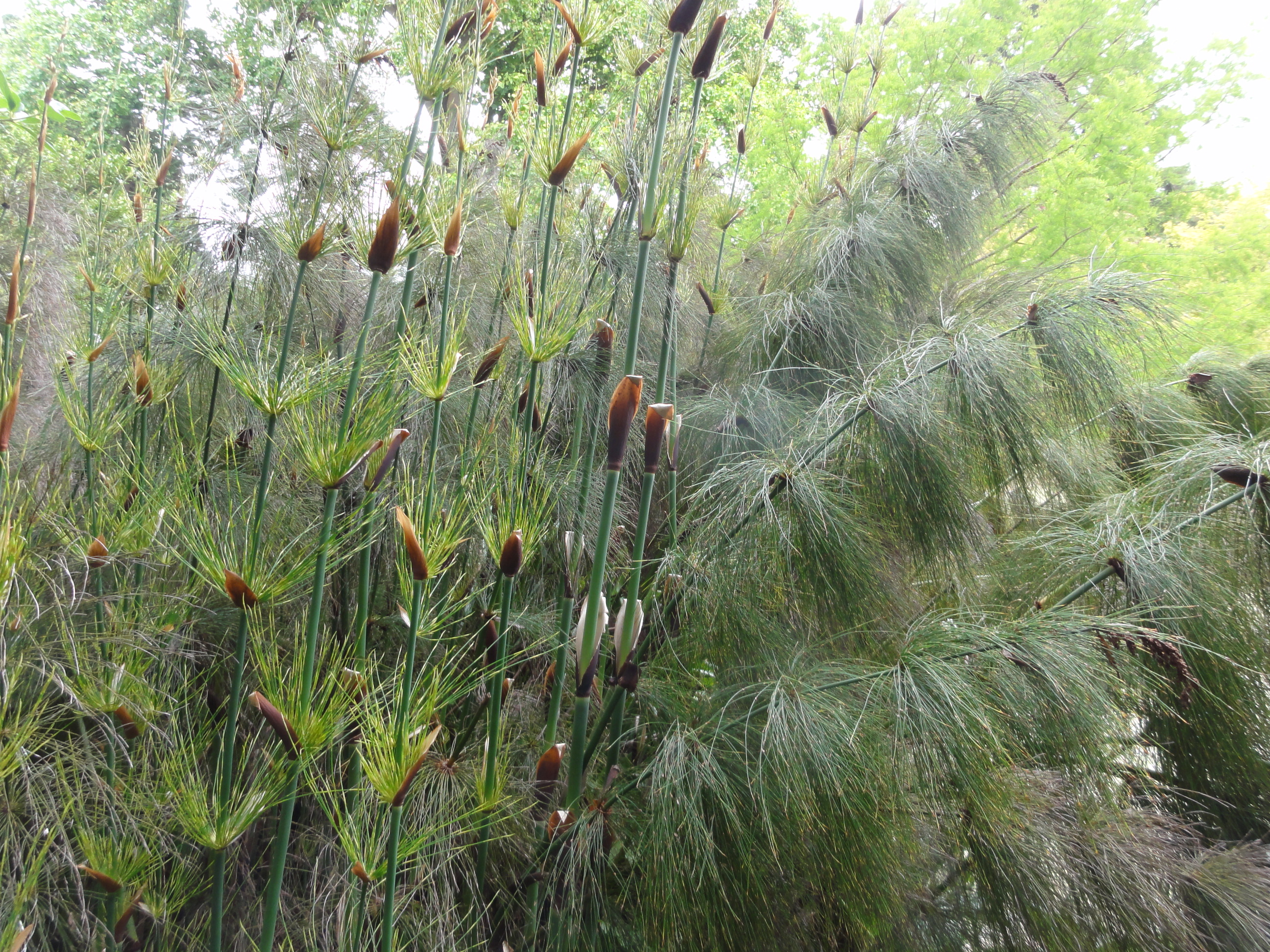
- At Christchurch Botanic Gardens

Scientific classification
- Kingdom: Plantae
- Clade: Embryophytes
- Clade: Tracheophytes
- Clade: Angiosperms
- Clade: Monocots
- Clade: Commelinids
- Order: Poales
- Family: Restionaceae
- Genus: Elegia
- Species: E. capensis

Binomial name
- Elegia capensis (Burm.f.) Schelpe

Synonyms
- Elegia verticillaris (L.f.) Kunth; Restio verticillaris L.f.; Restio verticillatus Spreng.

= Elegia capensis =

Species of flowering plant

Elegia capensis, called the horsetail restio, or bergbamboes is a species of grass‑like flowering plant in the genus Elegia, native to the Fynbos region of the Cape Provinces of South Africa. It has gained the Royal Horticultural Society's Award of Garden Merit. This flowering plant bears a strong resemblance to a scouring rush or horsetail (Equisetum spp.) with whorls of around 25 side shoots spaced 8–10 cm (3.1–3.9 in) apart. The plant is usually 1.5 m (4 ft 11 in) high but can reach 3 m (9.8 ft) on occasion. The flowers are brown and inconspicuous.
