= David Laserscanner =

DAVID-LASERSCANNER
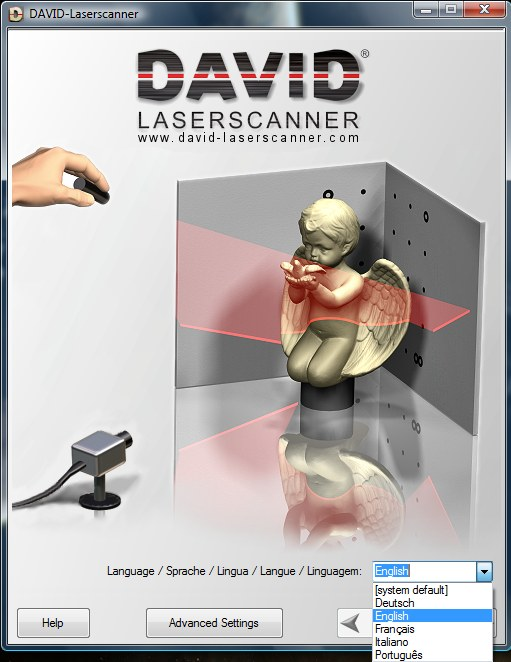
- Screenshot of DAVID-LASERSCANNER 2.1
- Stable release: 3.2
- Operating system: Windows
- Type: 3D Scanning, 3D computer graphics, Computer Aided Design
- License: Proprietary
- Website: www.david-laserscanner.com

DAVID Laserscanner is a software package for low-cost 3D laser scanning. It allows scanning and digitizing of three-dimensional objects using a camera (e.g. a web cam), a hand-held line laser (i.e. one that projects a line, not just a point), and two plain boards in the background. The software generates 3D data in real time and shows them on the computer screen while the laser line is swept over the object by hand (like a virtual brush). The line may be swept over the object multiple times, until the results are satisfactory.

The resulting 3D mesh can be exported into well-known file formats and can thus be imported and processed in most 3D applications. The software is also able to grab the texture and "stitch together" scans made from different viewing directions.

== Scanning process ==
An initial calibration is made to determine the lens parameters and location of the camera relative to the background boards, which are two vertical planes positioned at 90 degrees to one another behind the object to be scanned. When scanning, the camera must be able to see part of the laser line on each board. This enables the software to reconstruct the plane of the projected laser light. Once it has determined the two-dimensional plane that the line laser is projecting, it is able to analyse the image of the laser line falling on the scanned object and resolve it into points in space.

== History ==
Development of DAVID Laserscanner started in September 2006 by German computer scientists Dr. Simon Winkelbach and Sven Molkenstruck, research associates of the Institute for Robotics and Process Control of the TU Braunschweig. The concept has been published as a research paper and has received the Best Paper Award at the German Association for Pattern Recognition (DAGM) on September 14, 2006, in Berlin.
