= Reed level =

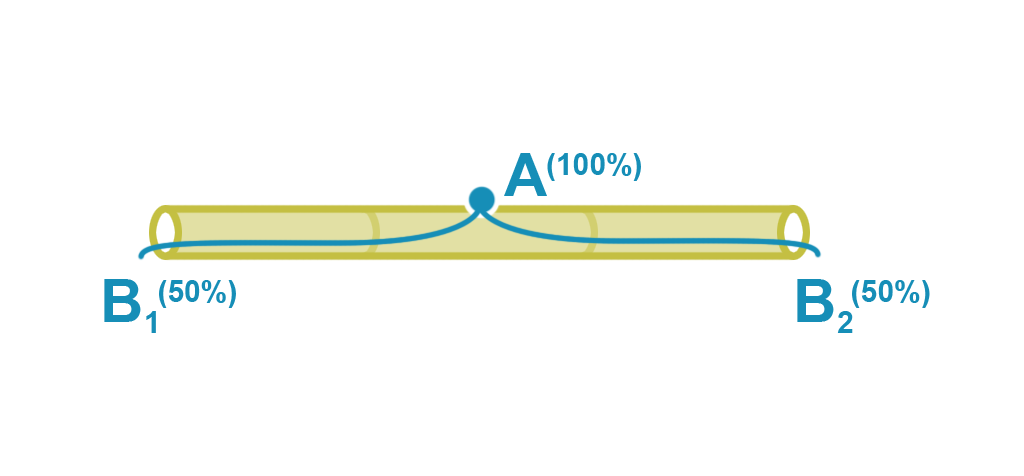
Water is poured into the center top of the reed grass. The total amount of water, as illustrated by A^{(100%)}, needs to be equally distributed across B_{1} and B_{2}. Equal output at both sides indicates that the reed is horizontally leveled.

A reed level is an Arabian invention used for determining the level in construction. It involves creating a hole through a long, straight reed and pouring water into its center. The reed is considered level when the flow of water out of both sides is equal. This device serves the same purpose as a spirit level.
