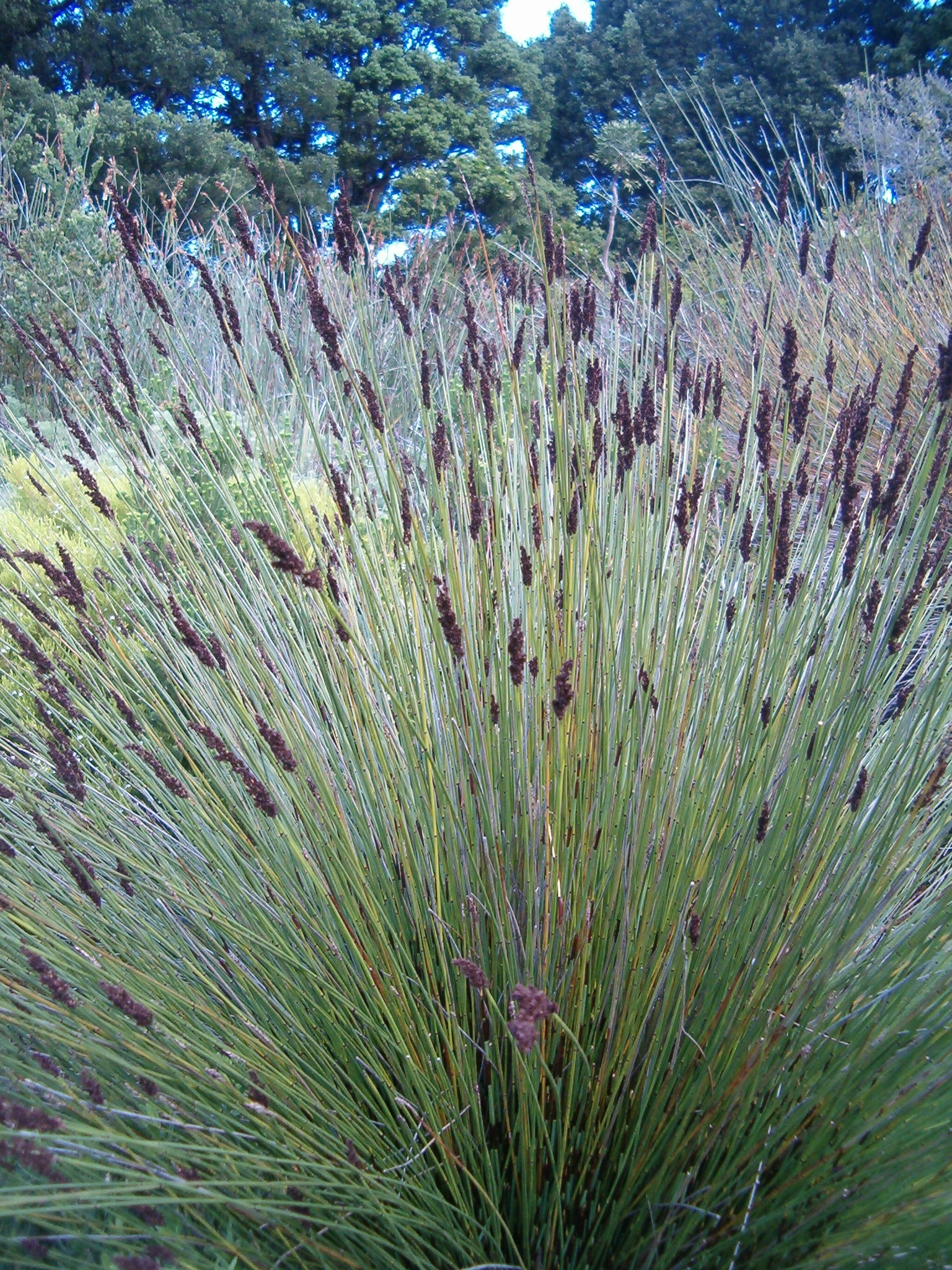
- Elegia tectorum in Kirstenbosch Botanical Gardens

Scientific classification
- Kingdom: Plantae
- Clade: Tracheophytes
- Clade: Angiosperms
- Clade: Monocots
- Clade: Commelinids
- Order: Poales
- Family: Restionaceae
- Genus: Elegia
- Species: E. tectorum

Binomial name
- Elegia tectorum (L.f.) Moline & H.P.Linder (2005)

= Elegia tectorum =

Species of flowering plant

Elegia tectorum, previously Chondropetalum tectorum or Restio tectorum, more commonly Cape thatching reed, or dakriet (in Afrikaans), is a member of the restio family, Restionaceae. It is a tufted perennial growing to between 1.5 and 2.25 m, with deciduous leaf sheaths. Flowers are less than 3 mm long. Petals are smooth or hairy in the upper half. E. tectorum is found in marshes and seeps on deep sand in the Western Cape and Eastern Cape of South Africa.

The species was originally noted by Carl Linnaeus the Younger. In 1838, E. tectorum was noted by Irish botanist William Henry Harvey (as R. Tectorum) for its use as a thatching material, and in the making of brooms and baskets. Historically, only the taller forms of the species, growing in the surroundings of Malmesbury, was used for thatching; the more popular thatching reed was Thamnochortus insignis. Carl Peter Thunberg also noted the use in thatching in 1793, as did English botanist John Lindley in 1846. Thurnberg notes the Dutch East India Company had a farm at Zeekoe Valley (17 km SSE of the Castle of Good Hope), where the reed was cultivated. He describes its use at the Cape of Good Hope as follows:

A bundle or sheath, after it is cut with a sickle is held by the top, and all the shorter stalks that are loose in it, are shaken off from it. The remaining long ones are then spread out in rows to dry, and afterwards tied up in bundles. With this the houses are commonly thatched both in town and in country; and sometimes whole huts are built with it. A roof made of it lasts 20 or 30 years, and would last much longer if the south-east wind did not blow a great deal of dirt between the thatch, in consequence of which it rots the sooner.

— Carl Peter Thunberg, Travels at the Cape of Good Hope, 1772-1775

Elegia tectorum was later called Chondropetalum tectorum, but cladistic analysis, conducted by Moline and Linder (2005) found that the genera of Chondropetalum and Dovea were imbedded in Elegia.

In cultivation in the UK this plant has gained the Royal Horticultural Society's Award of Garden Merit.
