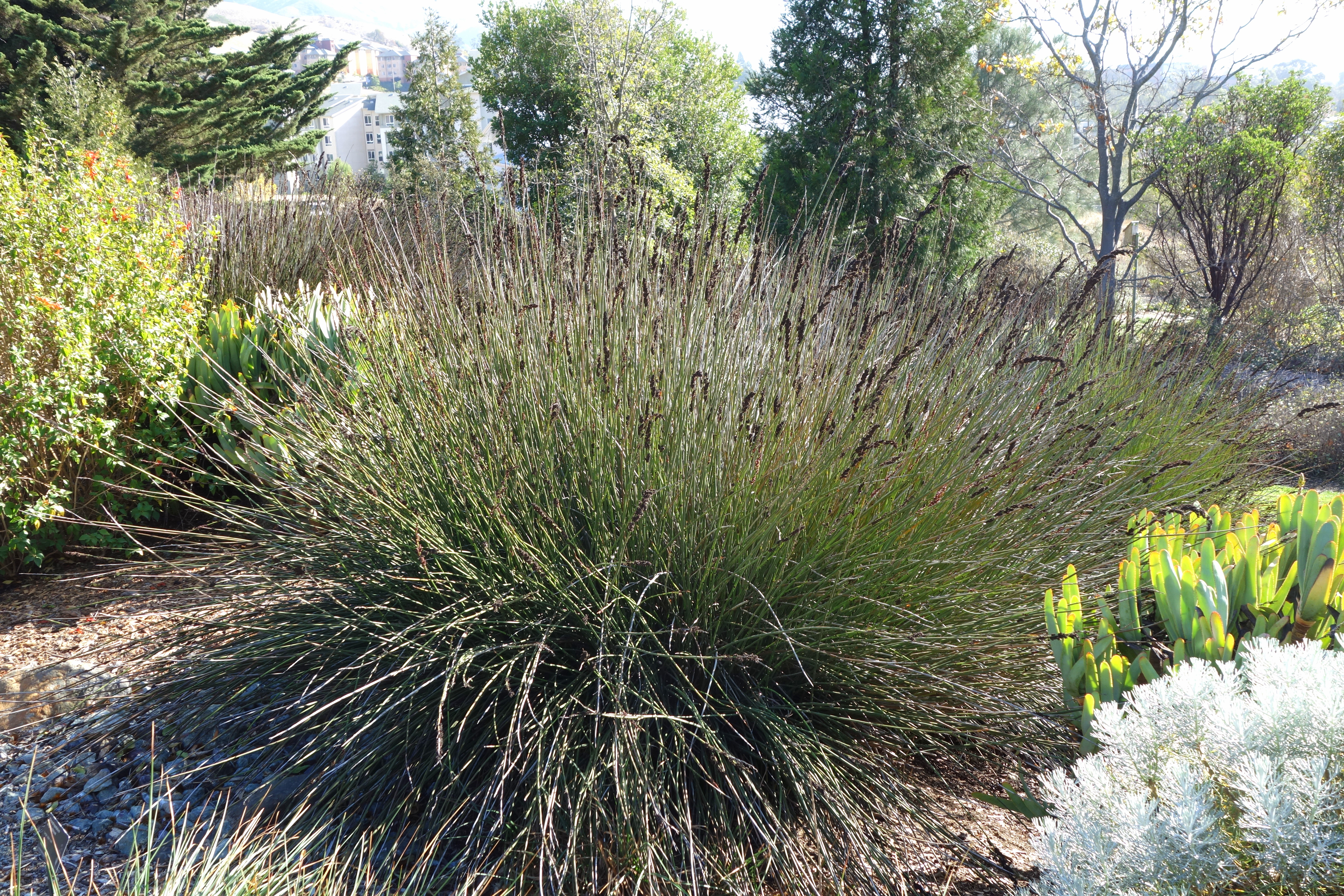

Scientific classification
- Kingdom: Plantae
- Clade: Embryophytes
- Clade: Tracheophytes
- Clade: Angiosperms
- Clade: Monocots
- Clade: Commelinids
- Order: Poales
- Family: Restionaceae
- Genus: Elegia
- Species: E. elephantina

Binomial name
- Elegia elephantina H.P.Linder

= Elegia elephantina =

Species of flowering plant

Elegia elephantina, the large Cape rush, is a species of reed‑like flowering plant in the family Restionaceae, native to the western Cape Provinces of South Africa. It has gained the Royal Horticultural Society's Award of Garden Merit as an ornamental.
