= Bull's eye level =

Tool to indicate whether a surface is level in two dimensions

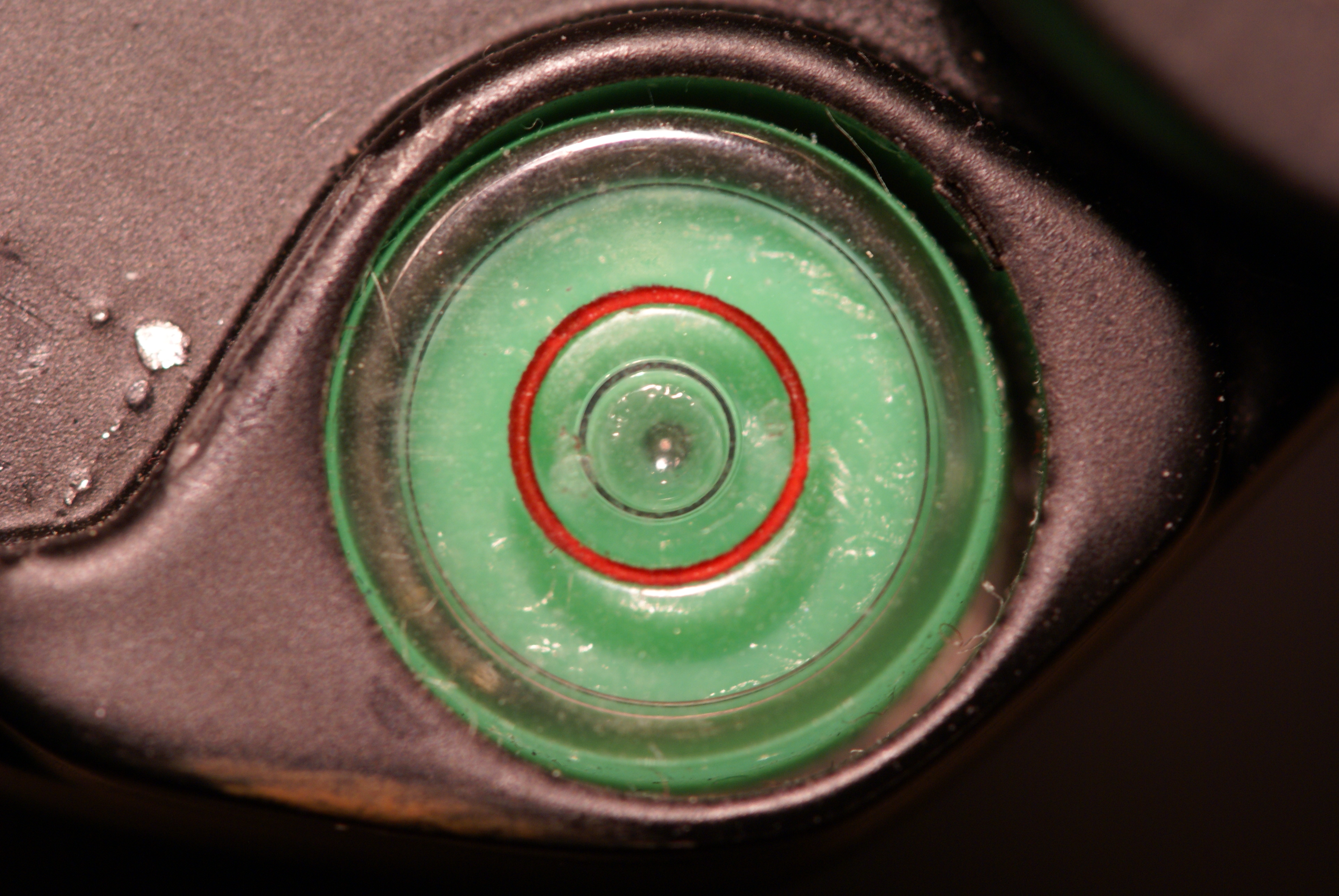
A bull's eye level showing a level position

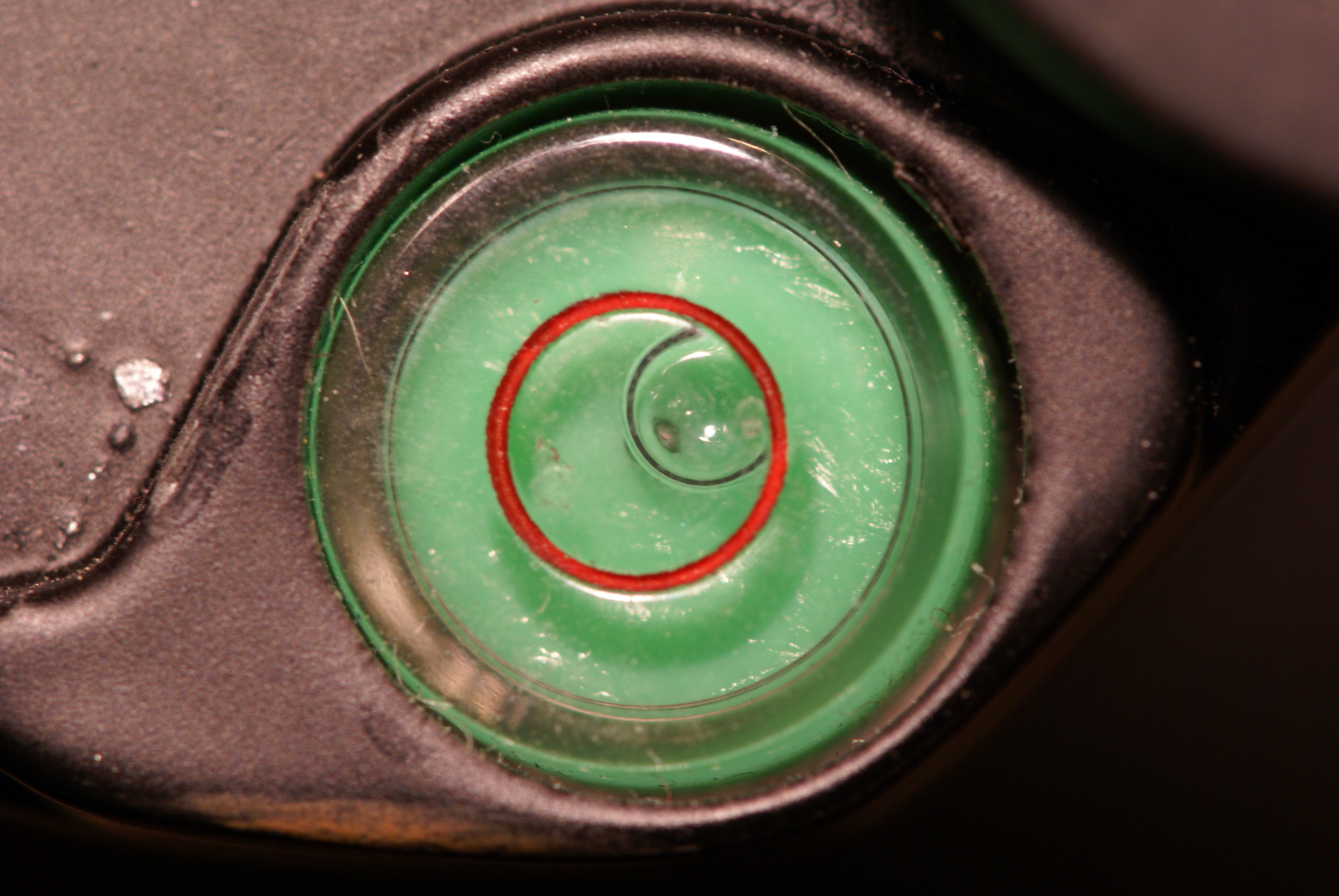
A bull's eye level showing an unlevel position

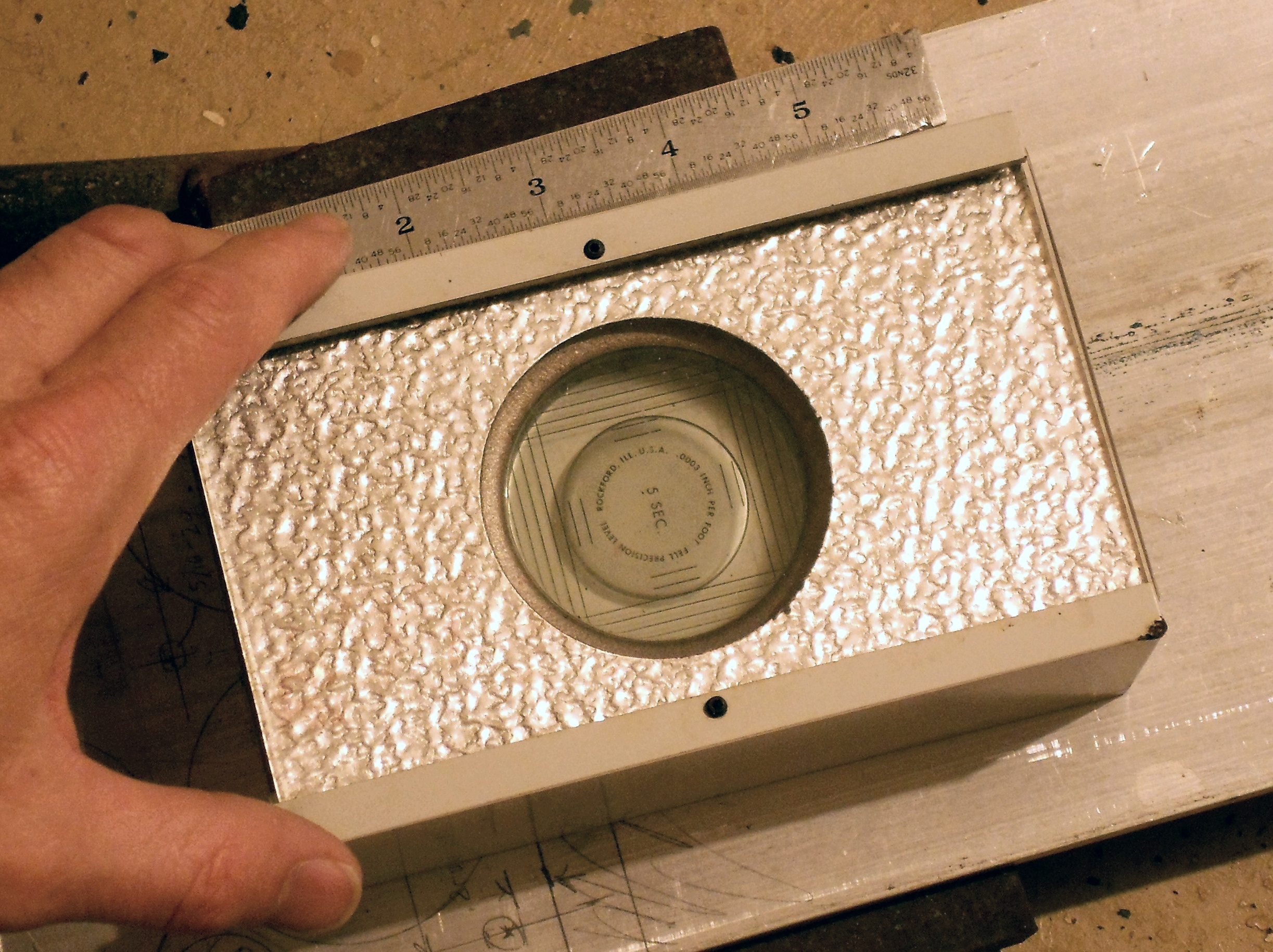
Machinist bulls-eye level

A bull's eye level is a type of spirit level that allows for the leveling of planes in two dimensions — both the 'pitch' and 'roll' in aeronautical terms. Standard tubular levels only consider one dimension. Bull's eye levels are used primarily by carpenters in construction, but can also be found as features of compasses or other devices that need to be kept from tipping in certain directions (whether it be for functionality or precision of measurements). Small bull's eye levels are also found incorporated into tripods.

Another name for a bull's eye level is a "circular bubble" which is the name used by surveyors in the United Kingdom. Surveying instruments such as theodolites (transits) and total stations often have a circular bubble as well as a tubular level or "plate level". The circular bubble is used to roughly level the instrument in two dimensions. The plate level is then used, rotating it 90 degrees between readings to level the instrument more precisely.

The Fell All-Way precision level, one of the first successful American made bull's eye levels for machine tool use, was invented by William B. Fell, Rockford, Illinois prior to World War II in 1939. The device was unique in that it could be placed on a machine bed and show tilt on x and y axes simultaneously; eliminating the need to rotate the level 90 degrees. The device set a new standard of 0.0005 inches per foot resolution (five ten thousands per foot or five arc seconds tilt). The level's production stopped around 1970. Production restarted in 1980s by Thomas Butler Technology, Rockford, Illinois, but finally ended in the mid 1990s. However, there are still hundreds of the highly prized devices in existence.
