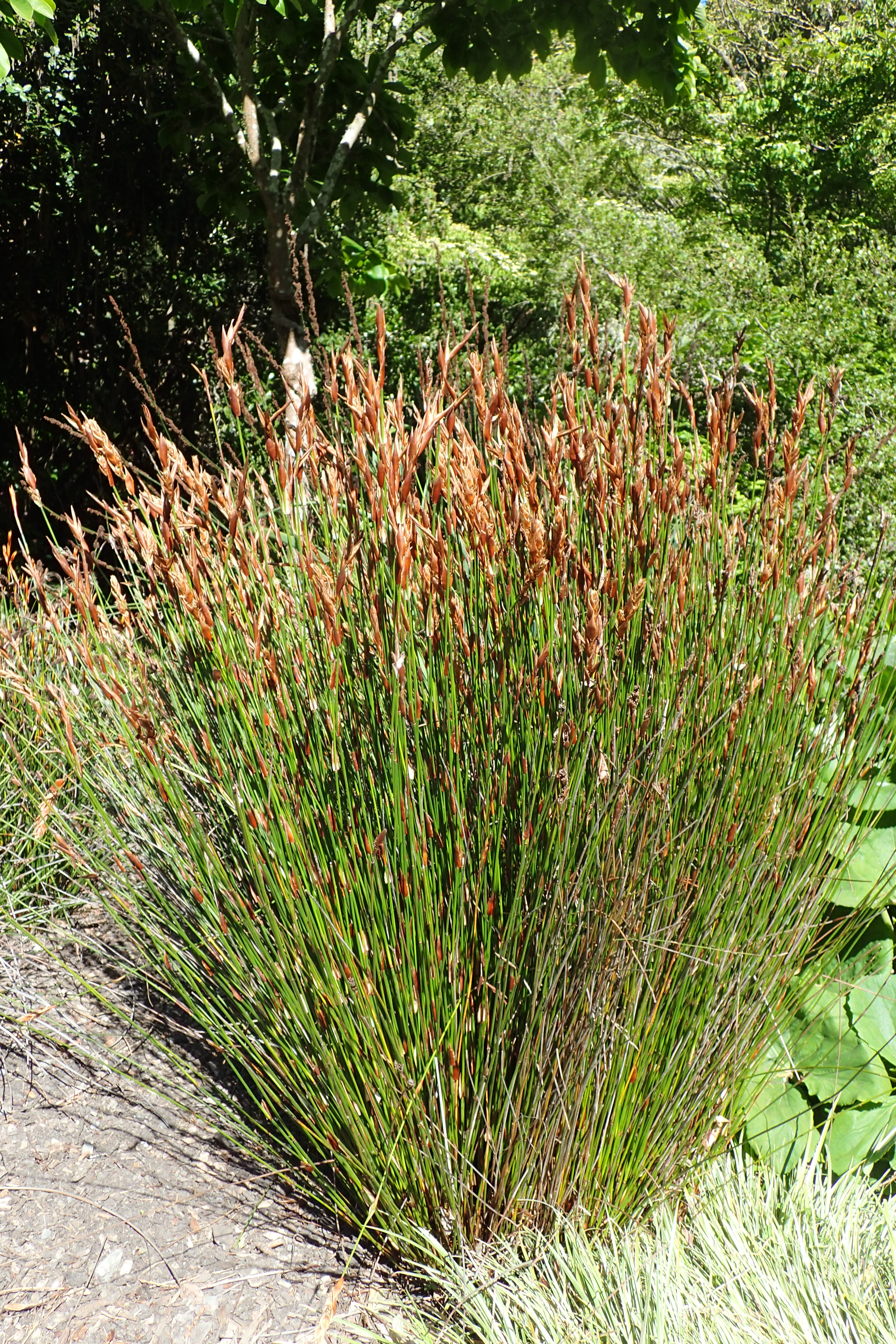
- Habit
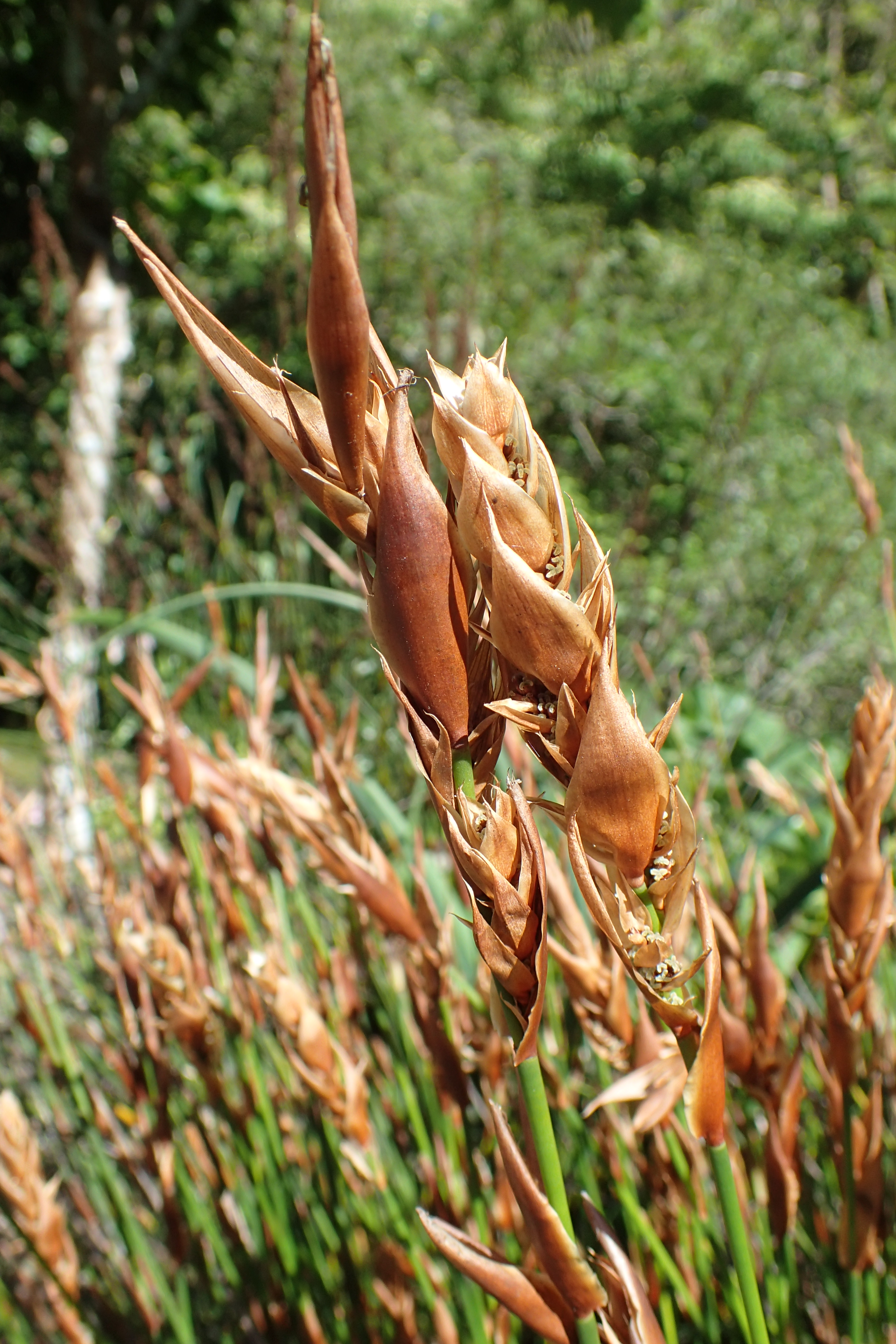
- Inflorescence

Scientific classification
- Kingdom: Plantae
- Clade: Embryophytes
- Clade: Tracheophytes
- Clade: Angiosperms
- Clade: Monocots
- Clade: Commelinids
- Order: Poales
- Family: Restionaceae
- Genus: Elegia
- Species: E. equisetacea

Binomial name
- Elegia equisetacea (Mast.) Mast.

Synonyms
- Elegia propinqua var. equisetacea Mast.

= Elegia equisetacea =

Species of flowering plant

Elegia equisetacea, the horsetail restio or broom reed, is a species of reed‑like flowering plant in the family Restionaceae, native to the southwestern Cape Provinces of South Africa. It has gained the Royal Horticultural Society's Award of Garden Merit as an ornamental.
