= Wheel tractor-scraper =

Type of heavy equipment used for earthmoving

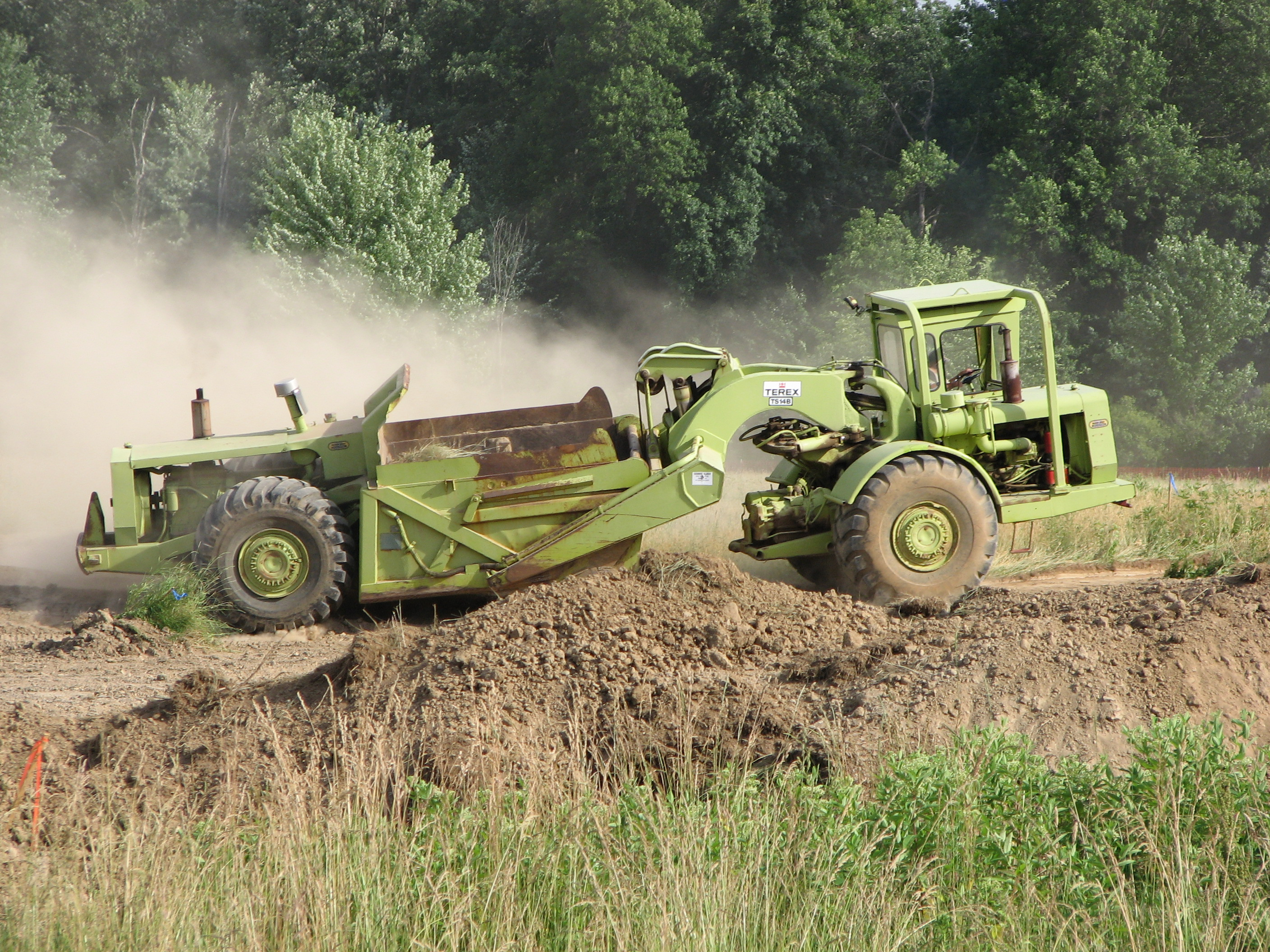
A twin engined Terex TS-14b scraper in Hudson, Ohio

Scraper pan pickup and drop off

In civil engineering, a wheel tractor-scraper (also known as a land scraper, land leveler, tournapull or simply called a scraper) is a type of heavy equipment used for earthmoving. It has a pan/hopper for loading and carrying material. The pan has a tapered horizontal front cutting edge that cuts into the soil like a carpenter's plane or cheese slicer and fills the hopper which has a movable ejection system. The horsepower of the machine, depth of the cut, type of material, and slope of the cut area affect how quickly the pan is filled.

When full, the pan is raised, the apron is closed, and the scraper transports its load to the fill area. There the pan height is set and the lip (bottom edge of the apron) is opened, so that the ejection system can be engaged for dumping the load. The forward momentum or speed of the machine affects how big an area is covered with the load. A high pan height and slow speed will dump the load over a short distance. With the pan set close to the ground, a higher speed will spread the material more thinly over a larger area.

In an "elevating scraper" a conveyor moves material from the cutting edge into the hopper.

== History ==
R.G LeTourneau conceived the idea of the self-propelled motor scraper while recovering from a near-fatal auto accident. He was an earth moving contractor dealer in bulldozer accessories and envisaged a pulled trailer that could excavate and pick up earth as it moved. He approached bulldozer manufacturer Caterpillar in the mid-1930s with his idea, but it was turned down, so he founded his own company. The first Tournapull, called the Model A, was rolled out of his factory and into trials in 1937. This concept was further developed by LeTourneau Westinghouse Company. Most current scrapers have two axles, although historically tri-axle configurations were dominant.

== Design ==
The wheel tractor-scraper is a large piece of wheeled equipment which is used in mining, construction, agriculture and other earthmoving applications. The front (tractor) portion is articulated to allow a relatively small turning radius. The rear (scraper) portion has a vertically moveable hopper (also known as the bowl) with a sharp horizontal front edge. The hopper can be hydraulically lowered and raised. When the hopper is lowered, the front edge cuts into the soil or clay like a plane and fills the hopper. When the hopper is full (8 to 56 m^{3} or 10 to 73 cu yd heaped, depending on type) it is raised, and closed with a vertical blade (known as the apron). The scraper can transport its load to the fill area where the blade is raised, the back panel of the hopper, or the ejector, is hydraulically pushed forward and the load tumbles out under the bowl while the machine is moving. Then the empty machine returns to the cut site and repeats the cycle. Suspension between the tractor and scraper ends typically uses a hydraulic cushion hitch design which can accommodate large load changes between empty and loaded.

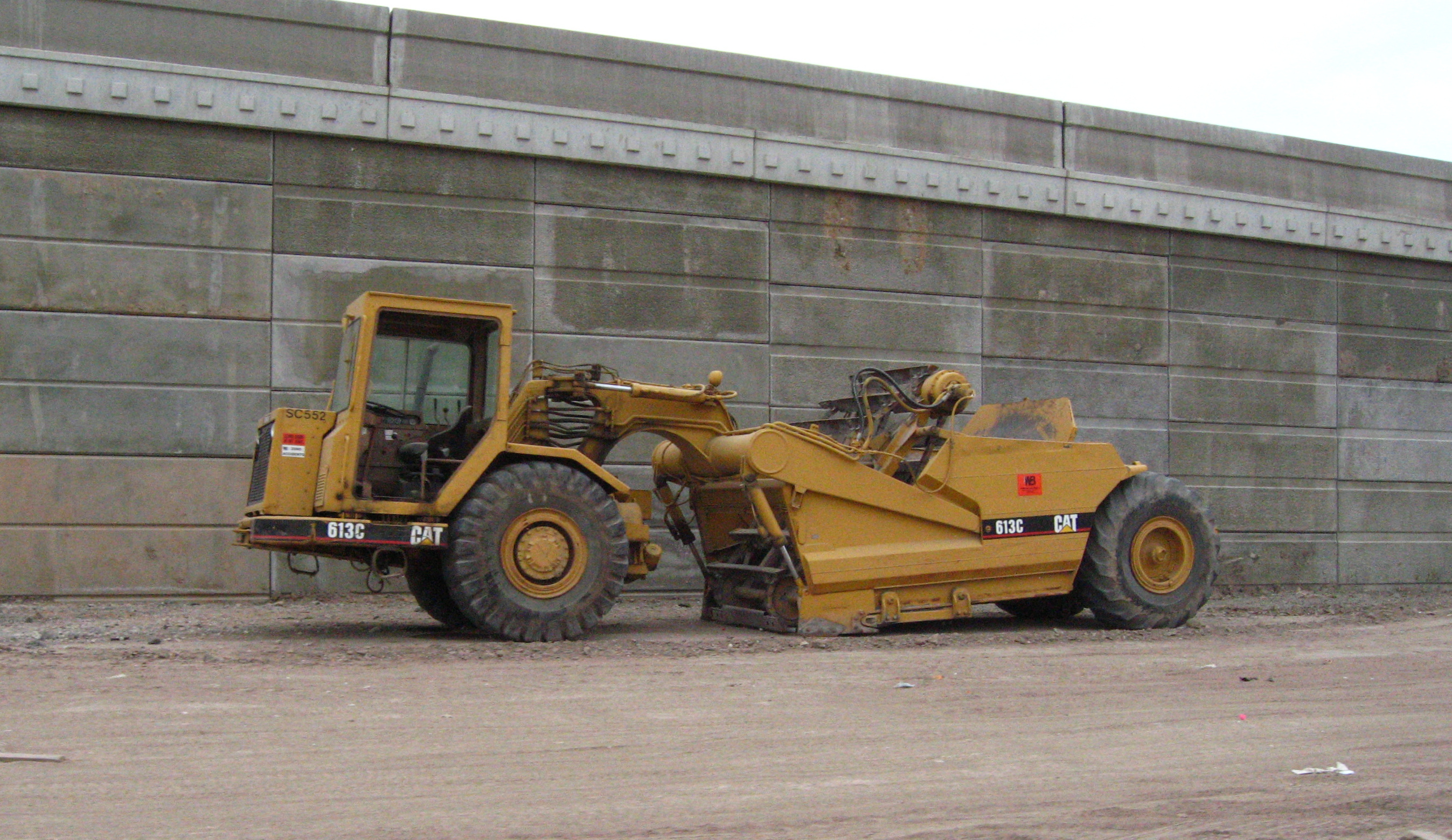
Caterpillar 613C elevating scraper

On the 'elevating scraper' the bowl is filled by a type of conveyor arrangement fitted with a horizontal flights to move the material engaged by the cutting edge into the bowl as the machine moves forward. Elevating scrapers do not require assistance from push-tractors to load material. The pioneer developer of the elevating scraper was Hancock Manufacturing Company of Lubbock, Texas USA.

Scrapers can be very efficient on short hauls where the cut and fill areas are close together and have sufficient length to fill the hopper. Smaller scrapers may be towed by a bulldozer, articulated truck, or tractor. The larger scraper types have two engines ("tandem powered"), one driving the front wheels, one driving the rear wheels, with engines up to 469 kW (629 hp) on tractor end, plus up to 353 kW (473 hp) on scraper end. Multiple scrapers can work together in a push-pull fashion using a bail and hook arrangement, or are commonly pushed by track type tractors to assist in loading more quickly.

Modern scrapers can also be factory equipped with Grade Control systems that use GPS Global Positioning System guidance combined with precise hydraulic controls to achieve desired grade in cut and fill areas with millimeter accuracy. Onboard payload systems can also use hydraulic cylinder pressures to estimate payload weight carried by the scraper for each load.

== Configurations ==
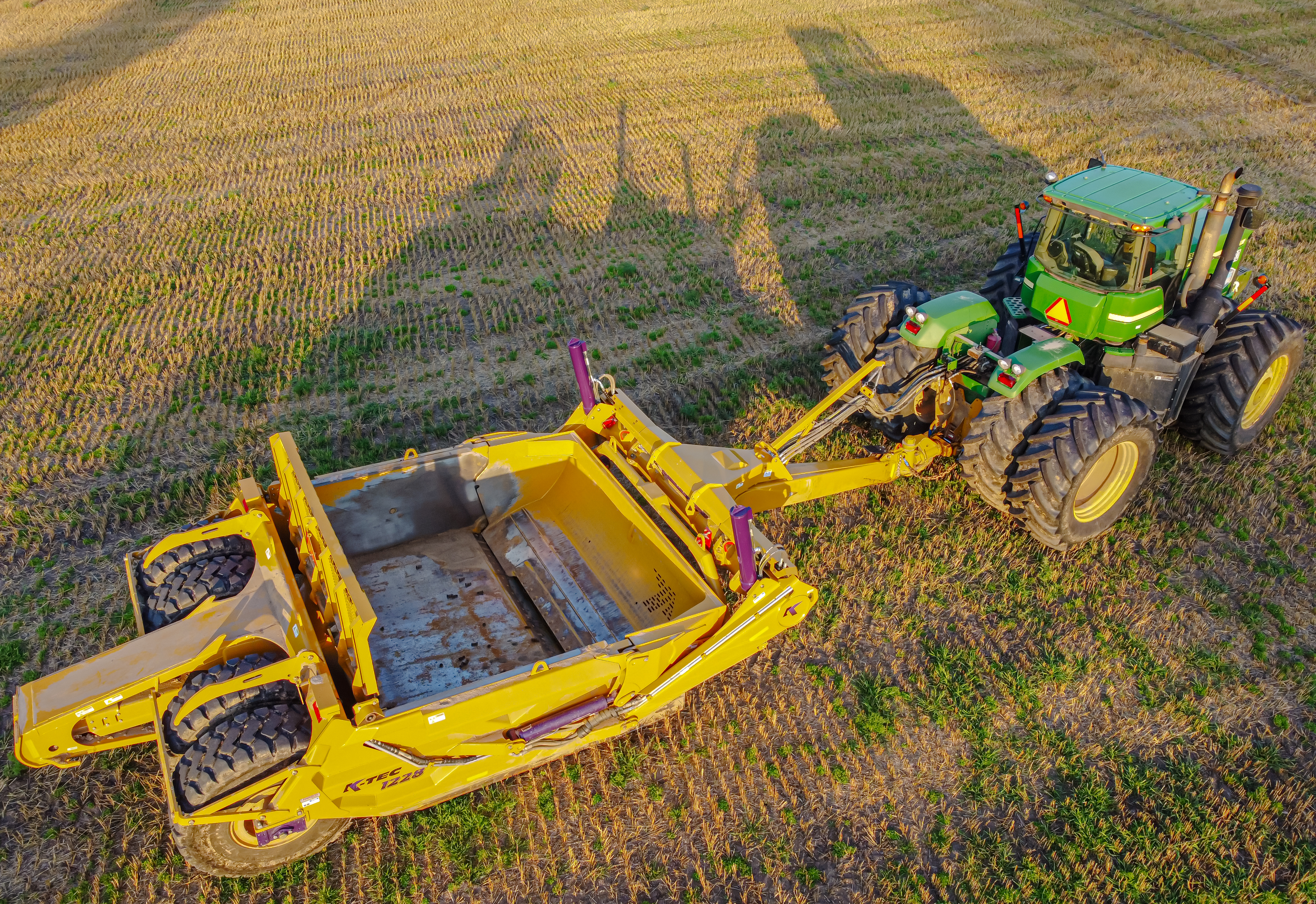
Tractor-pulled scraper

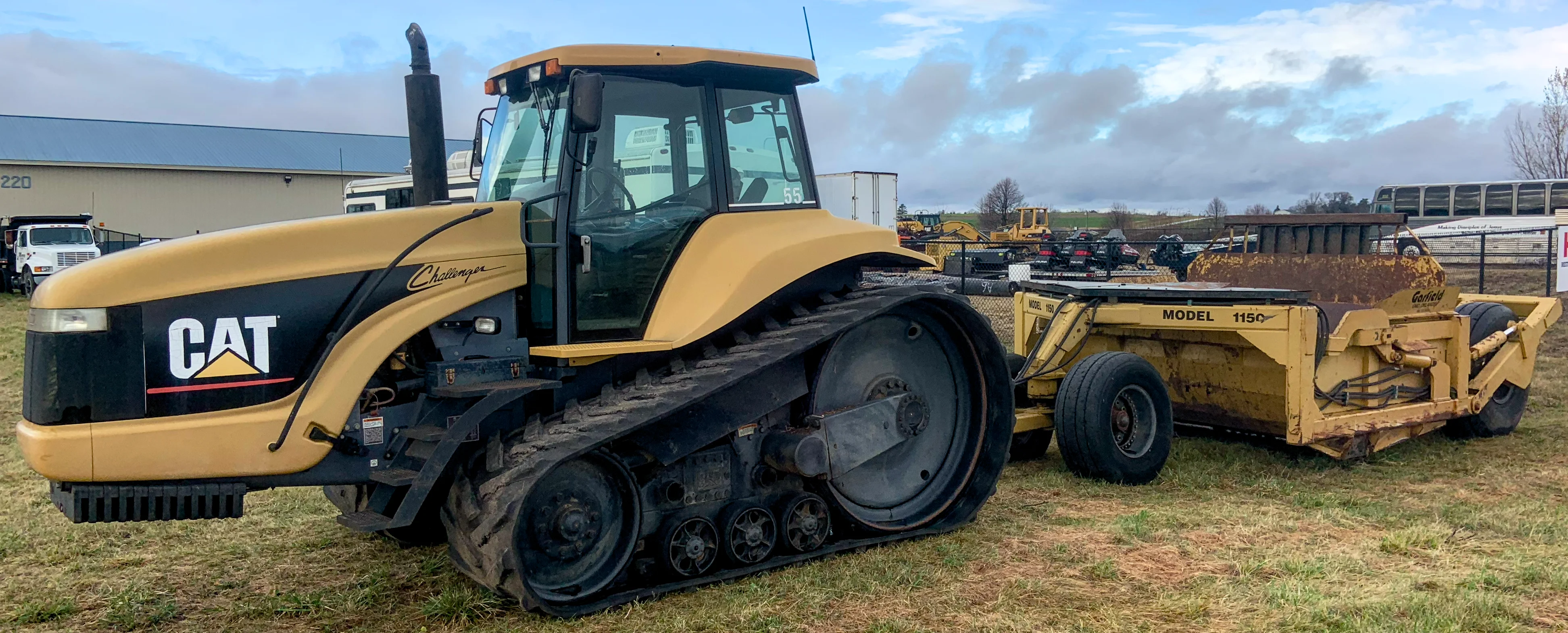
Challenger Tractor with a scraper pan behind

- Open bowl: usually requires a push-cat (bulldozer or similar) to assist in loading.
- Elevating scraper: self-loading as it uses an elevator to load material; requires no push-cat.
- Tandem scrapers: separate tractor and scraper engines provide greater power, and better traction in steep or slippery areas
- Tandem Push-Pull: concentrates the combined horsepower of two such machines onto one cutting edge. The push-pull attachment allows two individual scrapers to act as a self-loading system, typically loading both machines in less than a minute, one after the other.
- Auger: uses vertically mounted auger in the bowl to pull material upwards.
- Pull type scraper: uses agricultural tractor, articulated dump truck, or bulldozer to pull. Pull type scrapers can be utilized individually or two or three units can be pulled behind a single tractor.

== See also ==
- Fresno scraper, a horse pulled ancestor of the modern scraper
- Grader, an open-bladed rear-engined machine that scrapes or spreads out excess material
- Laser machine control
