= Ted Schelpe =

South African botanist (1924–1985)

Edmund André Charles Louis Eloi Schelpe aka Ted Schelpe (27 July 1924 Durban - 12 October 1985 Cape Town) was a South African botanist, phytogeographer and taxonomist, specialising in pteridophytes, bryophytes and orchids.

He was the son of Edmond Schelpe, lecturer and organist at Natal University, and Martha Clementina Beurms. He was married to fellow botanist Anna Sybella Louisa Gray (1917–2001), the marriage producing 3 children.

Schelpe attended Natal University in Pietermaritzburg between 1941 and 1946, graduating with an M.Sc. degree, after which he enrolled at Wadham College, Oxford, from 1947 to 1950 and was awarded a D.Phil. He was Curator of the Fielding Herbarium at Oxford during 1951–52. He held various posts at the University of Cape Town: Lecturer in Botany, 1953–1954; Senior Lecturer and Curator of the Bolus Herbarium, 1954–1958; Associate Professor and Curator of the Bolus Herbarium, 1968–1973, the title Curator being changed to Director from 1970; Professor (ad hominem) and Director of the Bolus Herbarium, 1973–1985.

He was an elected Fellow of the Royal Society of South Africa, the Linnean Society of London, and the University of Cape Town. From 1964 he served on the Committee on Pteridophyta of the International Association of Plant Taxonomists. He contributed greatly to the systematics of Pteridophyta in southern Africa. Shortly before his death he completed proof-reading the Pteridophyta volume for the Flora of Southern Africa. He also published accounts of the Pteridophyta for the Flora Zambesiaca, the Flora de Mocambique and the Conspectus Florae Angolensis. In all he produced some 100 scientific papers and books, covering topics in pteridophytes, orchids, bryophytes, plant ecology and phytogeography. The standard author abbreviation Schelpe is used to indicate this person as the author when citing a botanical name. In addition to his botanical skills he was also regarded as something of a yodelling expert.

Ted Schelpe died after suffering a heart attack at his Cape Town home on Saturday 12 October 1985.

== Publications ==
- An Introduction to the South African Orchids (London Macdonald, 1966)
- Namaqualand Wild Flower Guide - with Annelise le Roux (Botanical Society of SA, 1988)
