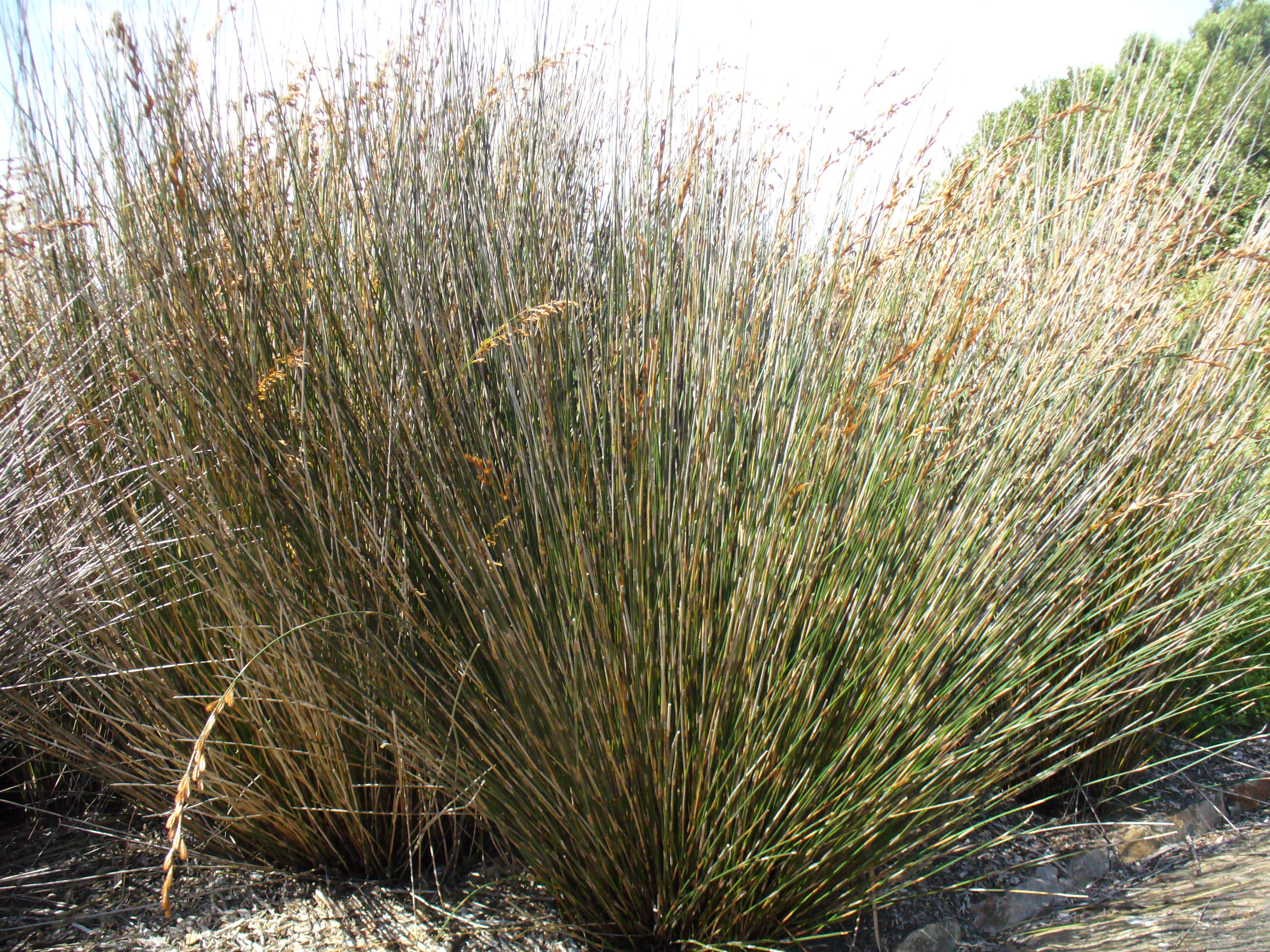

Scientific classification
- Kingdom: Plantae
- Clade: Embryophytes
- Clade: Tracheophytes
- Clade: Spermatophytes
- Clade: Angiosperms
- Clade: Monocots
- Clade: Commelinids
- Order: Poales
- Family: Restionaceae
- Genus: Thamnochortus
- Species: T. insignis

Binomial name
- Thamnochortus insignis Mast.

= Thamnochortus insignis =

Species of grass

Thamnochortus insignis is a species of grass-like restio of the family Restionaceae. It is endemic to Cape Province in South Africa.

== Appearance ==
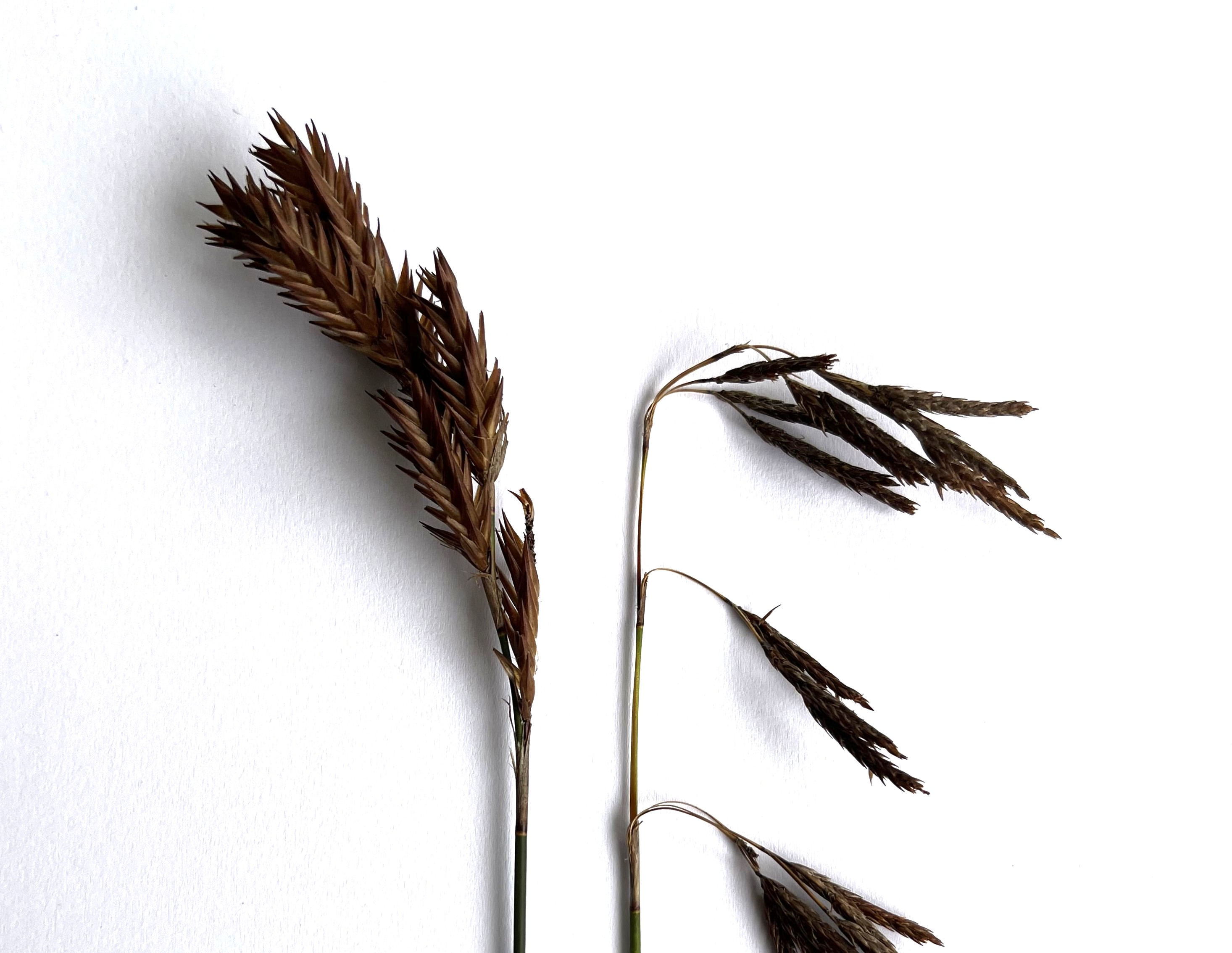
Female (left) and male heads of Thamnochortus insignis

Plants are tall, grass- or reed-like tussocks with a diameter of 500 mm to 1 metre at the base and a spread of 3 metres or more at the top and up to 2,5 m tall. Male and female plants are separate and very similar when they are not flowering.

== Range ==
Thamnochortus insignis grows in dense stands in the southern Cape around Albertinia. It can now be found along the roadsides from Port Elizabeth to the Cedarberg, where the seed has been distributed by the trucks carrying the thatching material.

== Propagation ==
The plants are wind pollinated with the male inflorescences in small tassels swaying in the wind, while the female flowers are at the base of medium sized bracts, which catch the pollen from the air and funnel it towards the small fringed styles of the female flowers.

The seed comes in the form of a tiny nutlet inside the old flower, which by this stage has formed two small wings. This helps the wind to carry the seeds away from the plant. The seeds are produced in very large quantities by each female plant, but are not all viable; a large number of nutlets are empty inside. Why the plants expend all this energy to produce sterile seeds is not clear, but is particular to this genus as well as to the genus Elegia.

== In cultivation ==
This restio is widely cultivated both for its usefulness as a thatching material as its name shows.

=== Gardens ===
Thamnochortus insignis is used as an ornamental plant. It is excellent in pots and can be easily established outside in mild districts (in the Northern Hemisphere). It is hardy to -3 °C.

== Environmental impact ==
The popularity of this species and the subsequent cultivation of it has led to the result in the elimination of other plant species in its native area.
