= Light section =

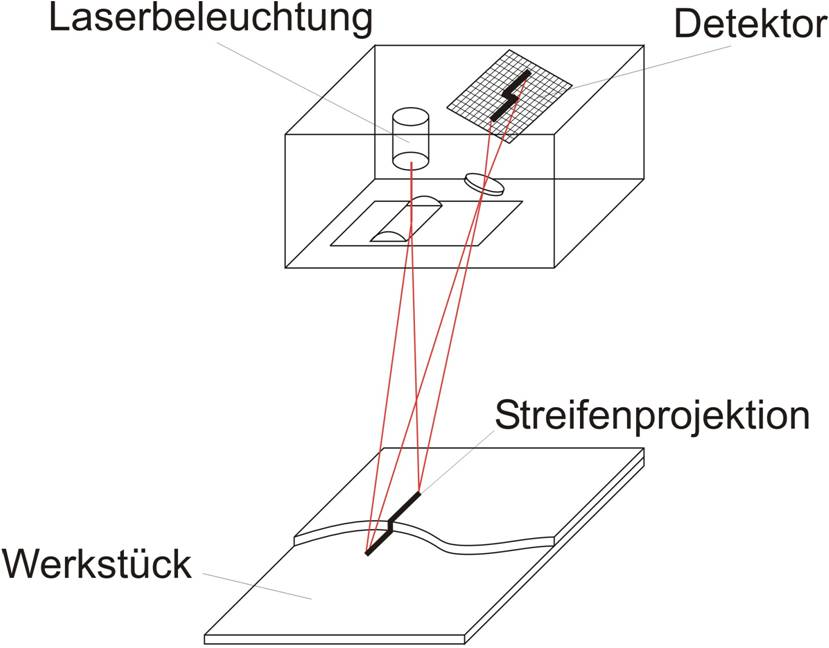
Schematic structure of a light section sensor

The light section is a technology for optical 3D measurement, which makes the measurement of a height profile along a projected line of light. It is based on the principle of triangulation.
