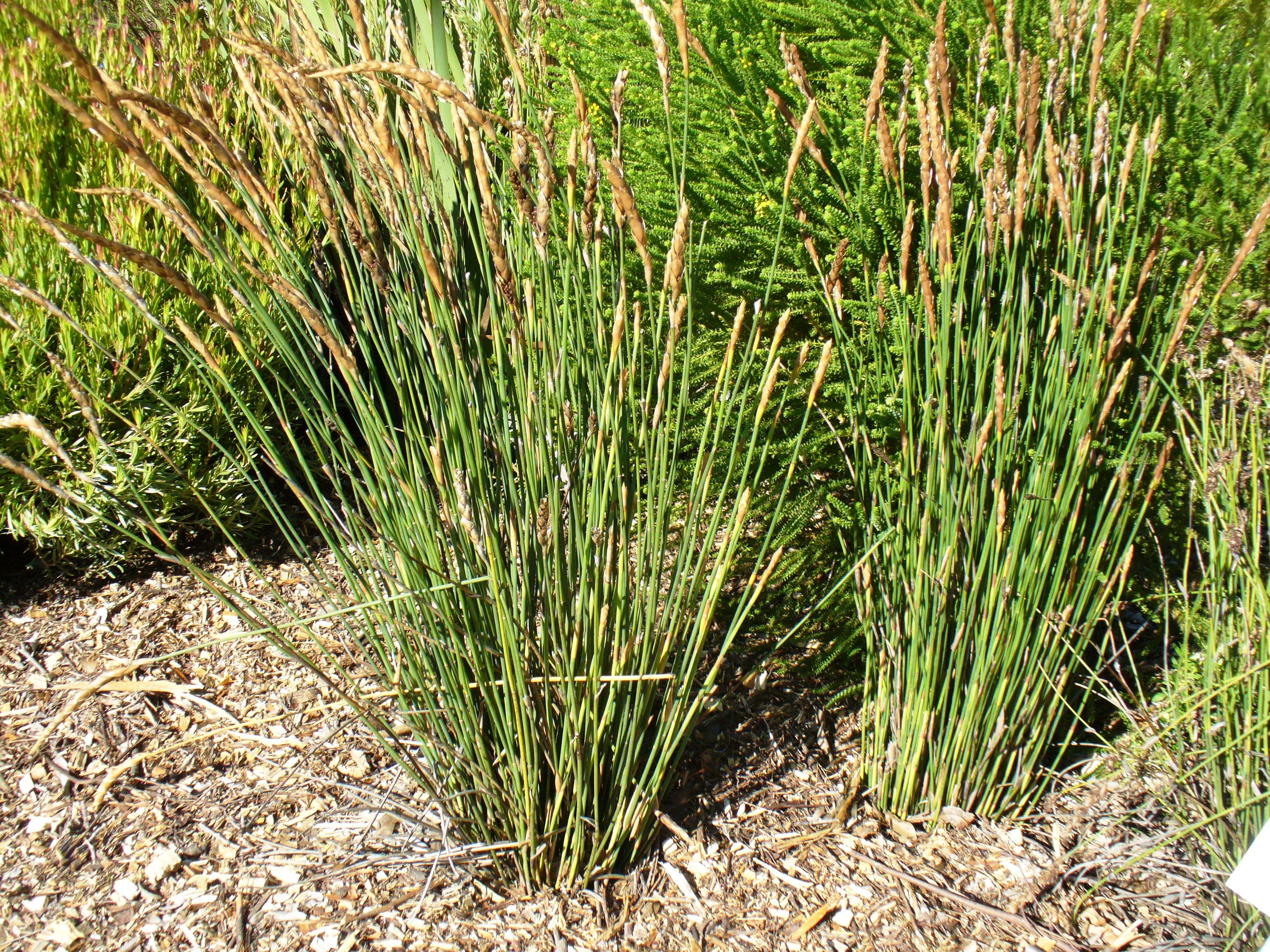
- Elegia fistulosa

Scientific classification
- Kingdom: Plantae
- Clade: Tracheophytes
- Clade: Angiosperms
- Clade: Monocots
- Clade: Commelinids
- Order: Poales
- Family: Restionaceae
- Genus: Elegia; L.

Synonyms
- Chondropetalum Rottb.; Dovea Kunth; Lamprocaulos Mast.

= Elegia (plant) =

Genus of flowering plants

Elegia is a genus of grass-like plants in the family Restionaceae endemic to Cape Province in South Africa. Some species are grown as ornamentals in gardens.

It was first described as a genus by Linnaeus in 1771.

Species

- Elegia acockii
- Elegia aggregata
- Elegia altigena
- Elegia asperiflora
- Elegia atratiflora
- Elegia caespitosa
- Elegia capensis
- Elegia coleura
- Elegia cuspidata
- Elegia decipiens
- Elegia deusta
- Elegia ebracteata
- Elegia elephantina
- Elegia equisetacea
- Elegia esterhuyseniae
- Elegia extensa
- †Elegia fastigata
- Elegia fenestrata
- Elegia filacea
- Elegia fistulosa
- Elegia fucata
- Elegia galpinii
- Elegia grandis
- Elegia grandispicata
- Elegia hookeriana
- Elegia hutchinsonii
- Elegia intermedia
- Elegia juncea
- Elegia macrocarpa
- Elegia marlothii
- Elegia microcarpa
- Elegia mucronata
- Elegia muirii
- Elegia neesii
- Elegia nuda
- Elegia persistens
- Elegia prominens
- Elegia racemosa
- Elegia recta
- Elegia rigida
- Elegia spathacea
- Elegia squamosa
- Elegia stipularis
- Elegia stokoei
- Elegia tectorum
- Elegia thyrsifera
- Elegia thyrsoidea
- Elegia vaginulata
- Elegia verreauxii
