= Laser machine control =

Laser machine control is an electronic system for automatic operation of land scrapers or excavators. Advanced systems with GPS replaced these laser-based systems in some countries, but it is still used in some countries like India.

== System components ==
There are different types of systems patented by different inventors or companies. But the generalised system has four essential parts: rotating laser transmitter, laser receiver, control unit, solenoid valves.

=== Rotating laser transmitter ===
The laser transmitter emits a narrow laser beam which rotates horizontally. this creates a Horizontal reference plane of laser beam. The beam can be spread horizontally but should be sharp and narrow in vertical plane. The transmitter may use infrared or red laser but for safety measure all manufacturers limits the power to 5 milliwatts. The transmitter uses semiconductor laser diodes as laser source which is powered by batteries.

The transmitter corrects its position to get perfect horizontal plane with acceleration sensor/ gyro sensors / bubble based level sensor and a microprocessor based servo mechanism.

=== Laser receiver ===
The laser receiver detects the height of laser plane with an array of photo diodes, generally a series of photo diodes in 9" strip with a gap between diodes equal to the width of the beam. The receiver reads the height with the sensors and convert to a usable analog or digital signal and sends to the machine control unit. Modern systems use CAN protocol for the output signals where old systems use a 4/5/6 channel analog current signal.

=== Control unit ===
The control unit is the processing unit which decides how to react with the incoming signals get a desired land level. It adjusts the height of the scraper by activating or deactivating the electro-hydraulic actuators (solenoid valves). Generally these are ON OFF type solenoid valves but some modern systems use proportional valves. On the dash board of control unit there are some keys and indicators are provided as user interface through which user can monitor the operation or manually operate the machine when needed.

=== Solenoid valves ===
Solenoid valves are act like an interface between the electrical systems and the hydraulic system, these can be on-off type or proportional depending on the control unit.
