= Repetition method =

Surveying technique

In surveying, the repetition method is used to improve precision and accuracy of measurements of horizontal angles. The same angle is measured multiple times, with the survey instrument rotated so that systematic errors tend to cancel. The arithmetic mean of these observations gives true value of an angle. The precision of the measurement can exceed the least count of the instrument.

The repetition method is used when high accuracy is required. For rough or approximate survey work, the ordinary method of measuring horizontal angles is used as it is less time consuming.

== See also ==
- Survey camp
- Adjustments of theodolite
- Ranging rods
- Prismatic compass (surveying)
