= Tape correction (surveying) =

In surveying, tape correction(s) refer(s) to correcting measurements for the effect of slope angle, expansion or contraction due to temperature, and the tape's sag, which varies with the applied tension. Not correcting for these effects gives rise to systematic errors, i.e. effects which act in a predictable manner and therefore can be corrected by mathematical methods.

== Correction due to slope ==
$\theta$ is the angle between the slope line and the horizontal line, s is the slope distance measured between two points on the slope line, h is the height of the slope.

$C_v =2L*sin^2 + \frac {A}{2}$

Where

          L= Inclined length measured
          A= Inclined angle

When distances are measured along the slope, the equivalent horizontal distance may be determined by applying a slope correction.

The vertical slope angle of the length measured must be measured. (Refer to the figure on the other side) Thus,

- For gentle slopes, $m<20\%$

$$C_h = \frac {h^2}{2s}$$

- For steep slopes, $20\%\le m \le 30\%$

$$C_h = \frac {h^2}{2s} + \frac {h^4}{8s^3}$$

- For very steep slopes, $m>30\%$

$$C_h = s(1-\cos \theta)$$,
Or, more simply, $d = s * \cos \theta$

Where:

$C_h$ is the correction of measured slope distance due to slope;
$\theta$ is the angle between the measured slope line and horizontal line;
s is the measured slope distance.
d is the horizontal distance.

The correction $C_h$ is subtracted from $s$ to obtain the equivalent horizontal distance on the slope line:

$$d = s - C_h$$

== Correction due to temperature ==
When measuring or laying out distances, the standard temperature of the tape and the temperature of the tape at time of measurement are usually different. A difference in temperature will cause the tape to lengthen or shorten, so the measurement taken will not be exactly correct. A correction can be applied to the measured length to obtain the correct length.

The correction of the tape length due to change in temperature is given by:

$$C_t = C \cdot L (T_m - T_s)$$

Where:

$C_t$ is the correction to be applied to the tape due to temperature;
C is the coefficient of thermal expansion of the metal that forms the tape;
L is the length of the tape or length of the line measured.
$T_m$ is the observed temperature of the tape at the time of measurement;
$T_s$ is the standard temperature, when the tape is at the correct length, often 20 °C;

The correction $C_t$ is added to $L$ to obtain the corrected distance:

$$d = L + C_t$$

For common tape measurements, the tape used is a steel tape with coefficient of thermal expansion C equal to 0.000,011,6 units per unit length per degree Celsius change. This means that the tape changes length by 1.16 mm per 10 m tape per 10 °C change from the standard temperature of the tape. For a 30 meter long tape with standard temperature of 20 °C used at 40 °C, the change in length is 7 mm over the length of the tape.

== Correction due to sag ==
A tape not supported along its length will sag and form a catenary between end supports. According to the section of tension correction some tapes are calibrated for sag at standard tension. These tapes will require complex sag and tension corrections if used at non-standard tensions. The correction due to sag must be calculated separately for each unsupported stretch separately and is given by:

$$C_s = \frac {{\omega}^2 L^3}{24P^2}$$

Where:

$C_s$ is the correction applied to the tape due to sag; meters;
$\omega$ is the weight of the tape per unit length; newtons per meter;
L is the length between the two ends of the catenary; meters;
P is the tension or pull applied to the tape; newtons.

A tape held in catenary will record a value larger than the correct measurement. Thus, the correction $C_s$ is subtracted from $L$ to obtain the corrected distance:

$$d = L - C_s$$

Note that the weight of the tape per unit length is equal to the weight of the tape divided by the length of the tape:

$$\omega = \frac {W}{L}$$

so: $W = \omega L$

Therefore, we can rewrite the formula for correction due to sag as:

$$C_s = \frac {W^2 L}{24 P^2}$$

=== Derivation (sag) ===
The general formula for a catenary formed by a tape supported only at its ends is

$$y = \frac{P}{\omega g} \cosh \left(\frac{x \omega g}{P}\right)$$.

Here, $g$ is the gravitational acceleration. The arc length between two support points at $x=-k/2$ and $x=+k/2$ is found by usual methods via integration:

$$L = \int_{-k/2}^{+k/2} \sqrt{1+\left(dy/dx\right)^2} \, dx$$

For convenience set $a=\frac{P}{\omega g}$. The integrand is simplified as follows using hyperbolic function identities:

$$\sqrt{1+\left(dy/dx\right)^2} = \sqrt{1+\left(\frac{d}{dx}\left(a \cosh\left(\frac{x}{a}\right)\right)\right)^2} = \sqrt{1+\sinh^2\left(\frac{x}{a}\right)} = \cosh\left(\frac{x}{a}\right)$$

The tape length $L$ is then found by integrating:

$$L = \int_{-k/2}^{+k/2} \cosh\left(\frac{x}{a}\right) dx = \left[a \sinh\left(\frac{x}{a}\right)\right]_{x=-k/2}^{x=+k/2} = \left(2a\right) \sinh\left(\frac{k}{2a}\right)$$

Now the correction for tape sag is the difference between the actual span between the supports, $k$, and the arc length of the tape's catenary, $L$. Call this correction $\delta = k - L$. The absolute value of this $\delta$ correction is $C_s$ above, the amount you would subtract from the tape measurement to get the true span distance.

A Taylor series expansion of $\delta$ in terms of the quantity $L$ is desired to give a good first approximation to the correction. In fact, the first nonvanishing term in the Taylor series is cubic in $L$, and the next nonvanishing term is to the fifth power of L; thus, a series expansion for $\delta$ is reasonable. To this end, we need to find an expression for $\delta$ that contains $L$ but not $k$. We already have an expression for $L$ in terms of $k$, but now need to find the inverse function (for $k$ in terms of $L$):

$$\frac{L}{2a} = \sinh\left(\frac{k}{2a}\right)$$
$$\sinh^{-1}\left(\frac{L}{2a}\right)= \frac{k}{2a}$$
$$k = \left(2a\right) \sinh^{-1}\left(\frac{L}{2a}\right)$$

$$\delta = k - L = \left(2a\right) \sinh^{-1}\left(\frac{L}{2a}\right) - L$$

Evaluating $\delta$ at $L=0$ yields zero, so there is no zero-order term in the Taylor series. The first derivative of this function with respect to L is

$$\frac{d\delta}{dL} = \frac{1}{\sqrt{\frac{L^2}{4 a^2}+1}}-1$$.

Evaluated at L=0, it vanishes and so does not contribute a Taylor series term. The second derivative of $\delta$ is

$$\frac{d^2\delta}{{dL}^2} = -\frac{L}{4 a^2 \left(\frac{L^2}{4 a^2}+1\right)^{3/2}}$$.

Again, when evaluated at L=0 it vanishes. When evaluated at L=0, the third derivative survives, however.

$$\frac{d^3\delta}{{dL}^3} = -\frac{ \left(8 a^3-4\text{aL}^2\right)}{\left(4 a^2+L^2\right)^{5/2} }$$

Thus, the first surviving term in the Taylor series is:

$$\delta \cong \left[\frac{d^3\delta}{{dL}^3}\right]_{L=0} \frac{ L^3}{3!} = -\frac{1}{4a^2} \frac{L^3}{6} = \frac{-L^3}{24a^2} = \frac{-L^3 \omega^2 g^2}{24 P^2}$$

Notice that the variable $P$ here is the tension on the cable, whereas above, $P$ is the mass whose gravitational force (mass times gravitational acceleration) equals the tension on the cable. The only conversion necessary then is to take $P/g$ here and equate it to $P$ above. Also, this formula is the tape sag correction to be added to the measured distance, so the negative sign in front can be removed and the tape sag correction can be made instead by subtracting the absolute value as is done in the preceding section.

=== Correction due to tension ===
Some tapes are already calibrated to account for the sag at a standard tension. In this case, errors arise when the tape is pulled at a Tension which differs from the standard tension used at standardization. The tape will pulled less than its standard length when a tension less than the standard tension is applied, making the tape too long.

A tape stretches in an elastic manner until it reaches its elastic limit, when it will deform permanently and ruin the tape.

The correction due to tension is given by:

$$C_p = \frac{(P_m - P_s)L}{AE}$$

Where:

$C_p$ is the elongation in tape length due to pull; or the correction to be applied due to applying a tension which differs from standard tension; meters;
$P_m$ is the tension applied to the tape during measurement; newtons;
$P_s$ is the standard tension, when the tape is the correct length, often 50 newtons; newtons;
L is the measured or erroneous length of the line; meters
A is the cross-sectional area of the tape; square centimeters;
E is the modulus of elasticity of the tape material; newtons per square centimeter;

The correction $C_p$ is added to $L$ to obtain the corrected distance:

$$d = L + C_p$$

The value for A is given by:

$$A = \frac {W}{(L)(U_w)}$$

Where:

W is the total weight of the tape; kilograms;
$U_w$ is the unit weight of the tape; kilograms per cubic centimeter.

For steel tapes, the value for $U_w$ is $7.866 \times 10^{-3} kg/cm^3$.

== Correction due to incorrect tape length ==
Manufacturers of measuring tapes do not usually guarantee the exact length of tapes, and standardization is a process where a standard temperature and tension are determined at which the tape is the exact length. The nominal length of tapes can be affected by physical imperfections, stretching or wear. Constant use of tapes causes wear, tapes can become kinked and may be improperly repaired when breaks occur.

The correction due to tape length is given by:

$$C_L = Corr \times M_L$$

Where:

C_{L} is the corrected length of the line to be measured or laid out;
M_{L} is the measured length or length to be laid out;
N_{L} is the nominal length of the tape as specified by its mark;
K_{L} is a known length;
Corr is the ratio of measured to actual length $\frac {M_L}{K_L}$, determined by measuring a known length.

In the U.S., some tapes come with United States Bureau of Standards certifications establishing the correction needed per 100' of tape.

Note that incorrect tape length introduces a systematic error that must be calibrated periodically.

== See also ==
- Local attraction
