= Temporary adjustments of theodolites =

Temporary adjustments are a set of operations which are performed on a theodolite to make it ready for taking observations. These include its initial setting up on a tripod or other stand, centering, levelling up and focusing of eyepiece.

== Initial setting ==
The measurement axes and scales of a theodolite

The initial setting operation includes fixing the theodolite on a tripod, along with approximate levelling and centering over the station mark. For setting up the instrument, the tripod is placed over the station with its legs widely spread so that the centre of the tripod head lies above the station point and its head approximately level (by eye estimation). The instrument is then fixed with the tripod by screwing through the trivet.
The height of the instrument should be such that observer can see through telescope conveniently. After this, a plumb bob is suspended from the bottom of the instrument and it should approximately align with the station mark.

== Centering ==
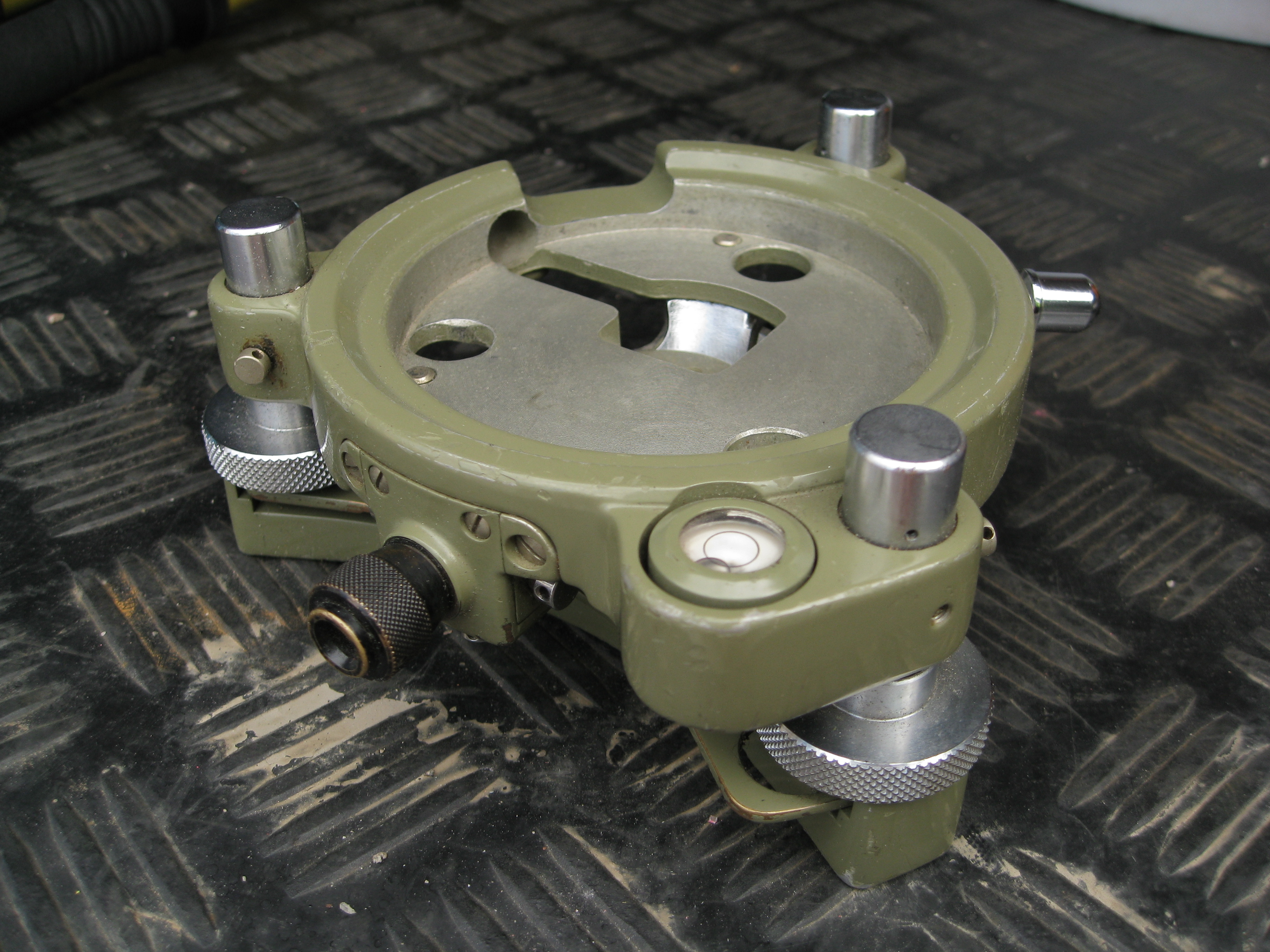
A tribrach with an optical plummet (the black cylinder pointing to the left lower corner of the image)

Centering means bringing the vertical axis of the theodolite exactly over the station mark.

Exact centering is done by using the shifting head of the instrument. During this, first the screw-clamping ring of the sliding head is loosened and the upper plate of the shifting head is slid over the lower one until the plumb bob is exactly over the station mark. After the exact centering, the screw clamping ring is tightened. This can be done by means of a forced centering plate or tribrach. An optical or laser plummet is normally used for the most accurate setting. The centering and levelling of the instrument is interactive and iterative; a re-levelling may change the centering, so error each is eliminated successively until negligible.

== Levelling ==
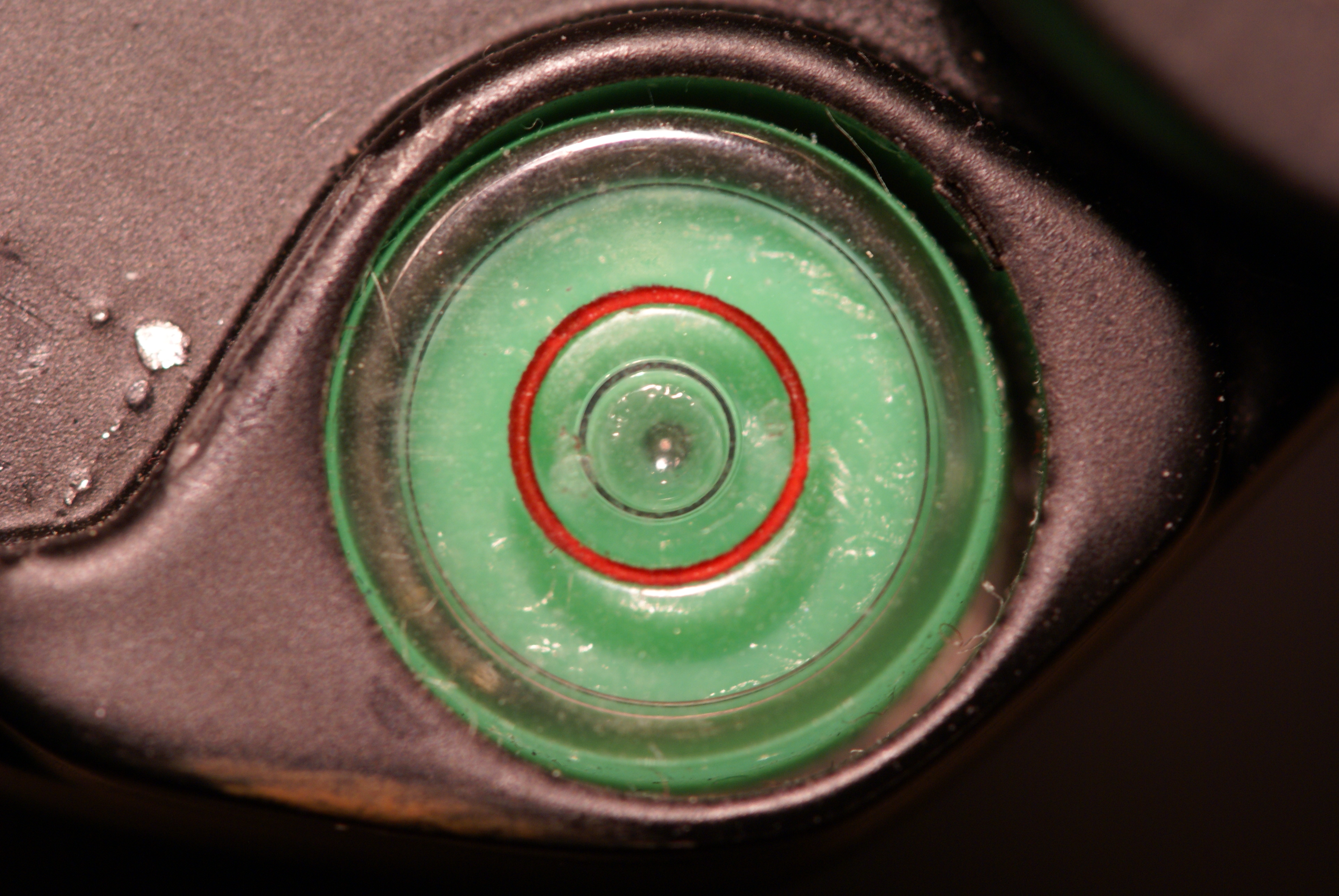
Bull's eye level with alignment rings

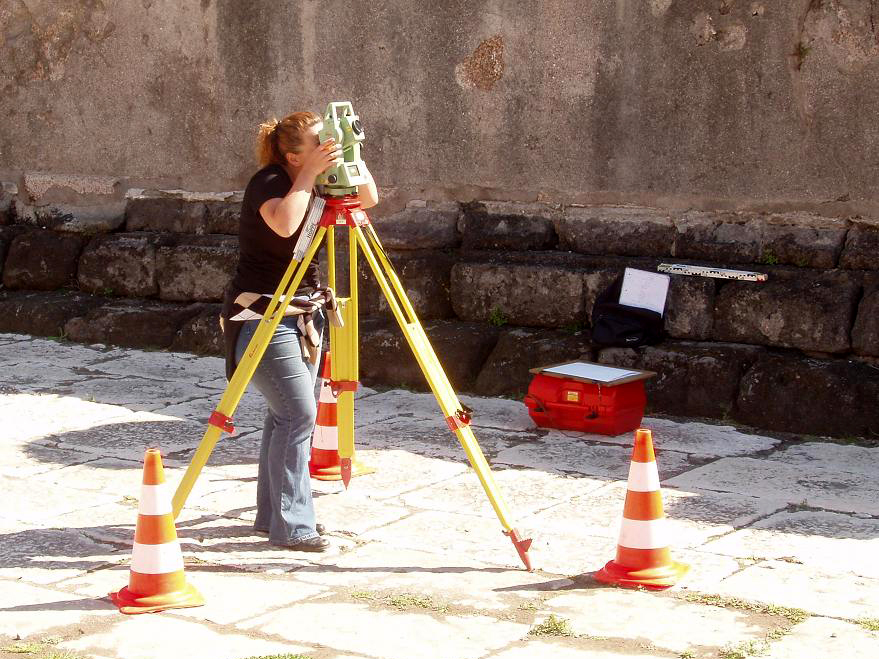
Theodolite in use with cones to protect tripod positioning

Leveling of an instrument is done to make its vertical axis adjusted with respect to the apparent force of gravity at the station.

For two spirit vials at right angles:

1. Bring one of the level tubes parallel to any two of the foot screws, by rotating the upper part of the instrument.
2. The bubble is brought to the centre of the level tube by rotating both the foot screws either inward or outward. The bubble moves in the same direction as the left thumb.
3. The bubble of the other level tube is then brought to the centre of the level tube by rotating the third foot screw either inward or outward. [In step 1 itself, the other plate level will be parallel to the line joining the third foot screw and the centre of the line joining the previous two foot screws.]
4. Repeat step 2 and step 3 in the same quadrant till both the bubble remain central.
5. By rotating the upper part of the instrument through 180°, the level tube is brought parallel to first two-foot screws in reverse order. The bubble will remain in the centre if the instrument is in permanent adjustment.
  Otherwise, repeat the whole process starting from step 1 to step 5.

The same principle applies to a bulls-eye level:

1. Bring the level parallel to any two of the foot screws, by rotating the upper part of the instrument.
2. The bubble is brought to the centre of the level tube by rotating both the foot screws either inward or outward.
3. Rotate the upper part of the instrument through 180°, so the level is over the remaining foot screw. The bubble will remain in the centre if the instrument is in permanent adjustment. If not adjust this screw to halve the error. Then rotate back through 180° and check the error. Adjust those screws to halve the residual error. Continue until the bubble is always central on the ring.

== Focusing ==
To obtain an accurate clear sighting, the cross hairs should be in focus; adjust the eyepiece to do this.

Focusing of eyepiece lens
For focusing of the eye piece, point the telescope to the sky or hold a piece of white paper in front of telescope. Move the eye-piece in and out until a distinct sharp black image of the cross-hairs is seen. This confirms proper focusing.

To clearly view the object being sighted focus the objective lens.

Focusing of objective lens
It is done for each independent observation to bring the image of the object in the plane of cross hairs. It includes following steps of operation: First, direct the telescope towards the object for observation. Next, turn the focusing screw until the image of the object appears clear and sharp as the observer looks through properly focused eye-piece. If focusing has been done properly, there will be no parallax i.e., there will be no apparent movement of the image relative to the cross hairs if the observer moves his eye from one side to the other or from top to bottom.

== See also ==
- Permanent adjustments of theodolite
- Tape (surveying)
- Ranging rods
- Survey camp
- Local attraction
