= Adjustments of theodolite =

Adjustments of theodolite may refer to:

- Permanent adjustments of theodolite
- Temporary adjustments of theodolite

== See also ==
- Adjustment computations
