= Road curve =

Section of pathway that changes direction

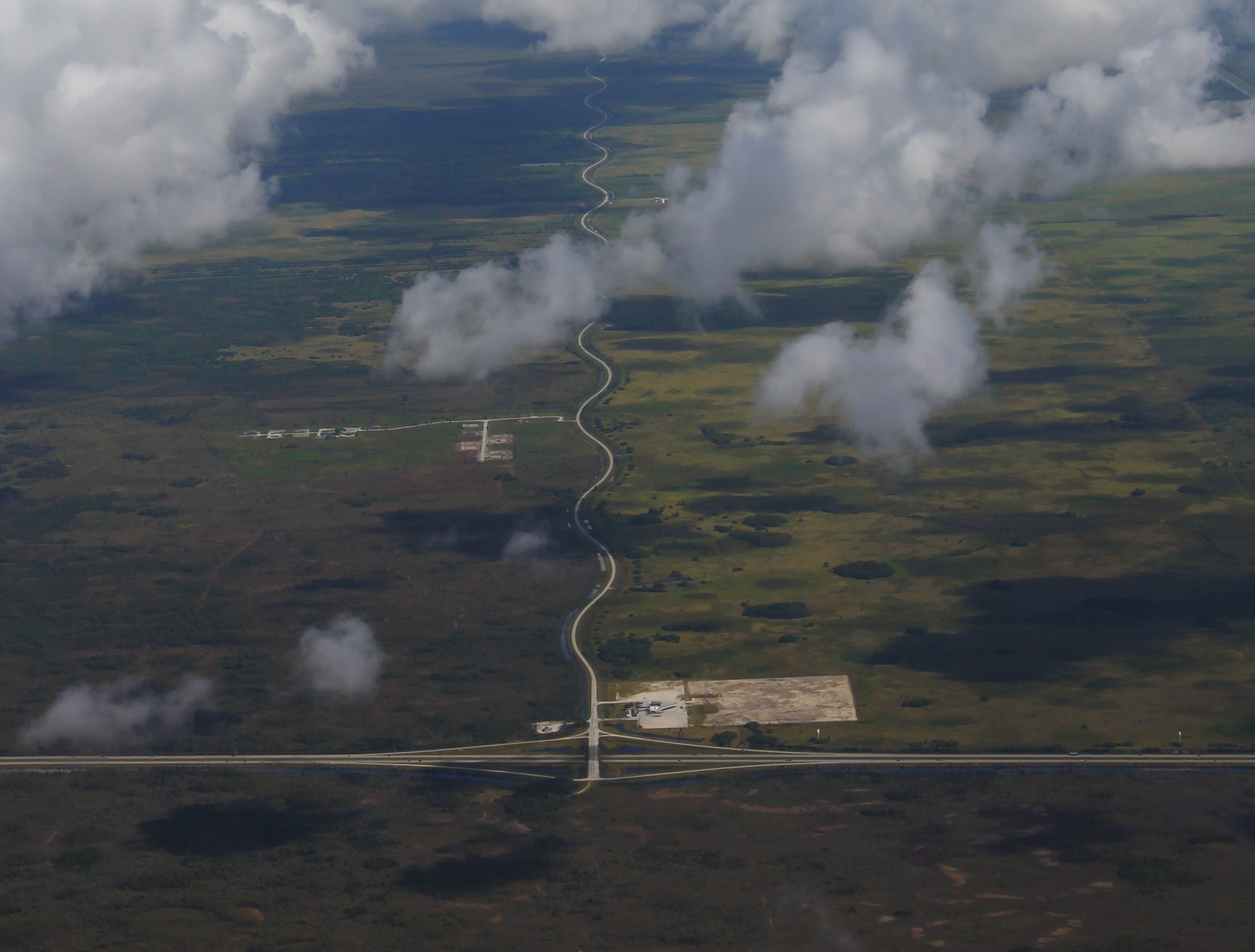
Curvy road in through swamps in Florida

Road curves are irregular bends in roads to bring a gradual change of direction. Similar curves are on railways and canals.

Curves provided in the horizontal plane are known as horizontal curves and are generally circular or parabolic. Curves provided in the vertical plane are known as vertical curves.

Five types of horizontal curves on roads and railways:

- Simple curve
- Compound curve
- Transition curve
- Reverse curve
- Deviation curve

Two types of vertical curves on roads:

- Valley curve
- Summit curve

== Horizontal Curve ==
=== Simple curve ===
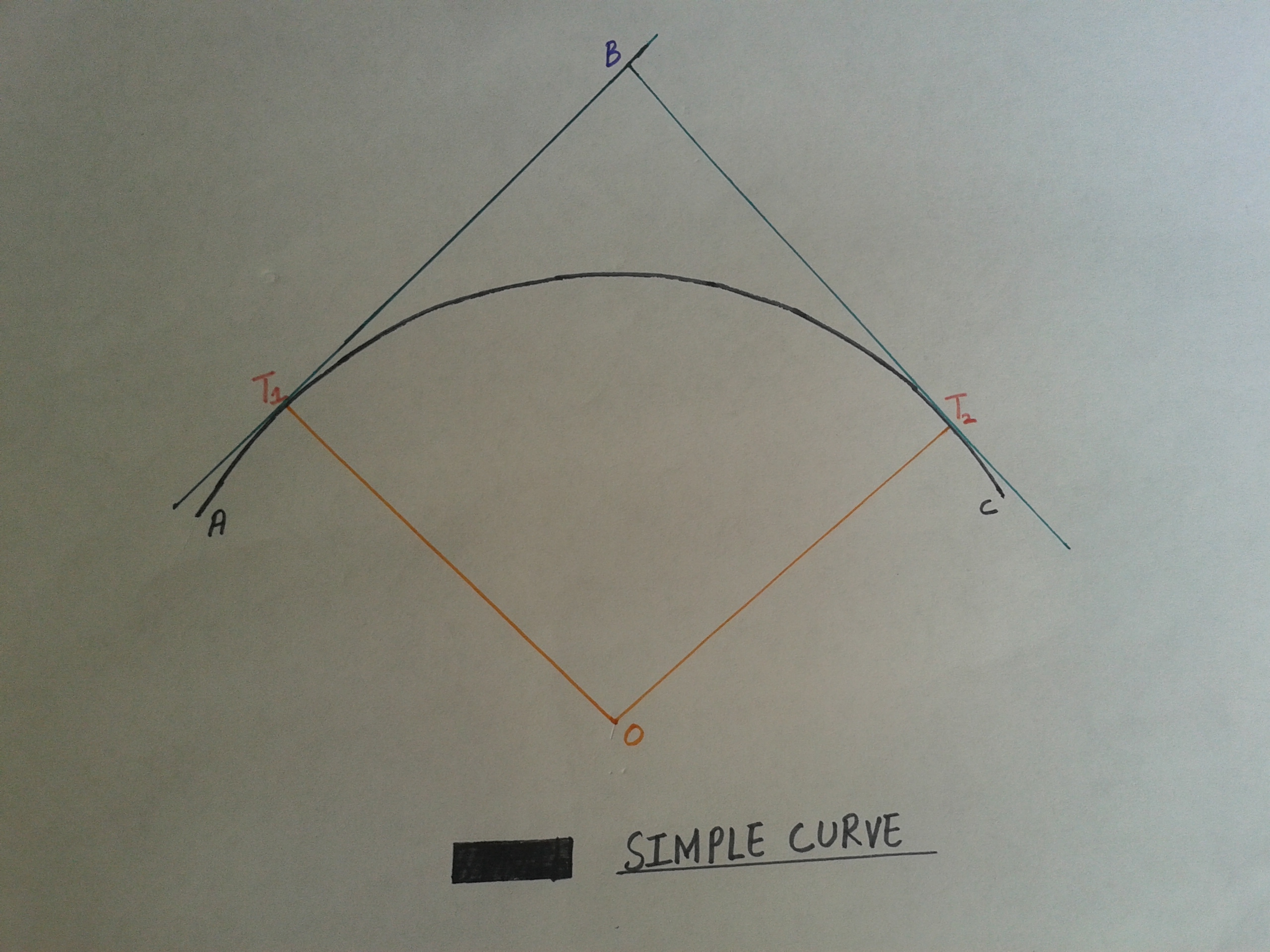
Diagram of simple curve

A simple curve has the same radius throughout and is a single arc of a circle, with two tangents meeting at the intersection (B in this diagram).

=== Compound curve ===
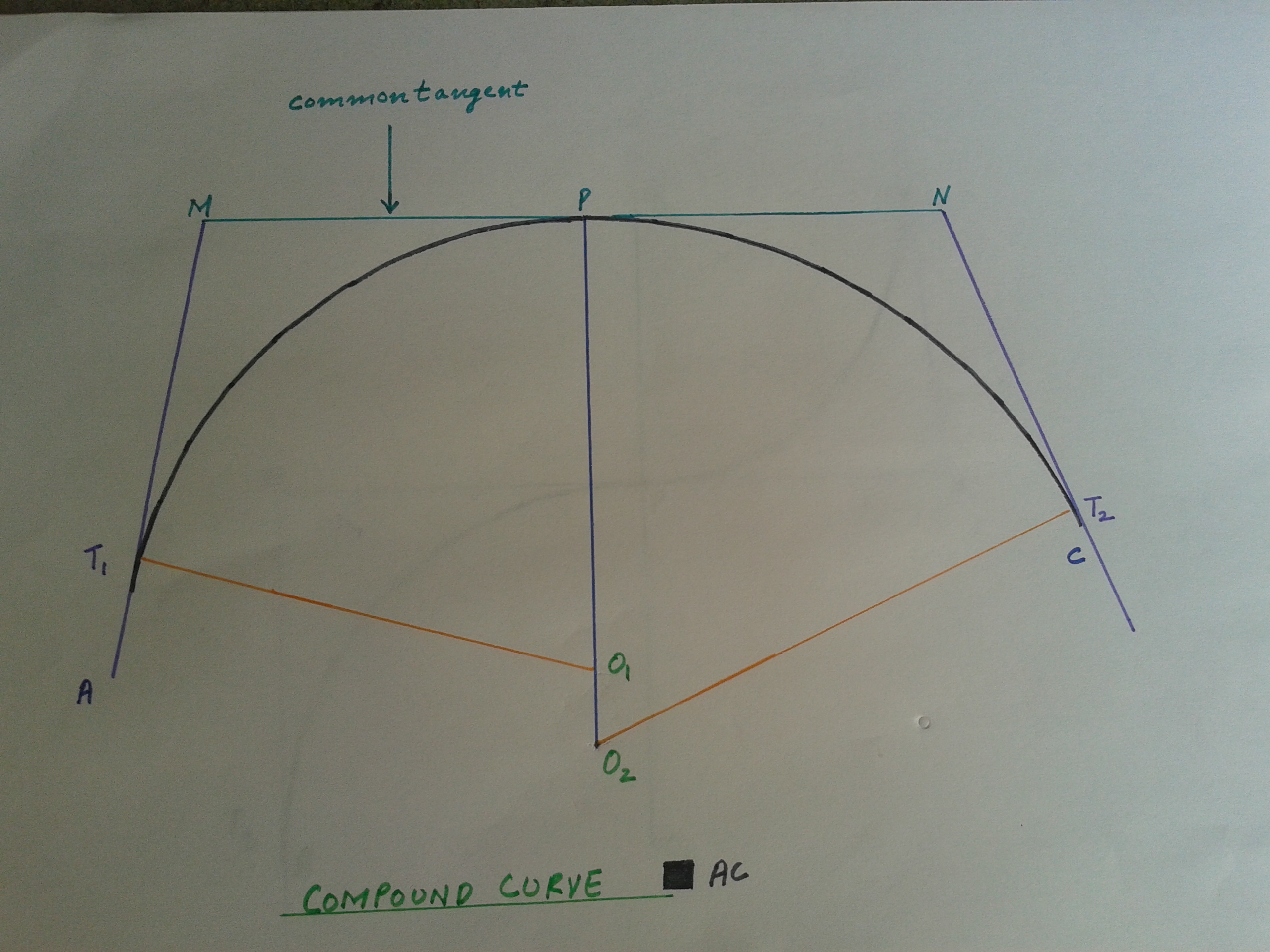
Diagram of compound curve

A compound curve has two or more simple curves with different radii that bend the same way and are on the same side of a common tangent. In this diagram, MN is the common tangent.

=== Reverse curve ===
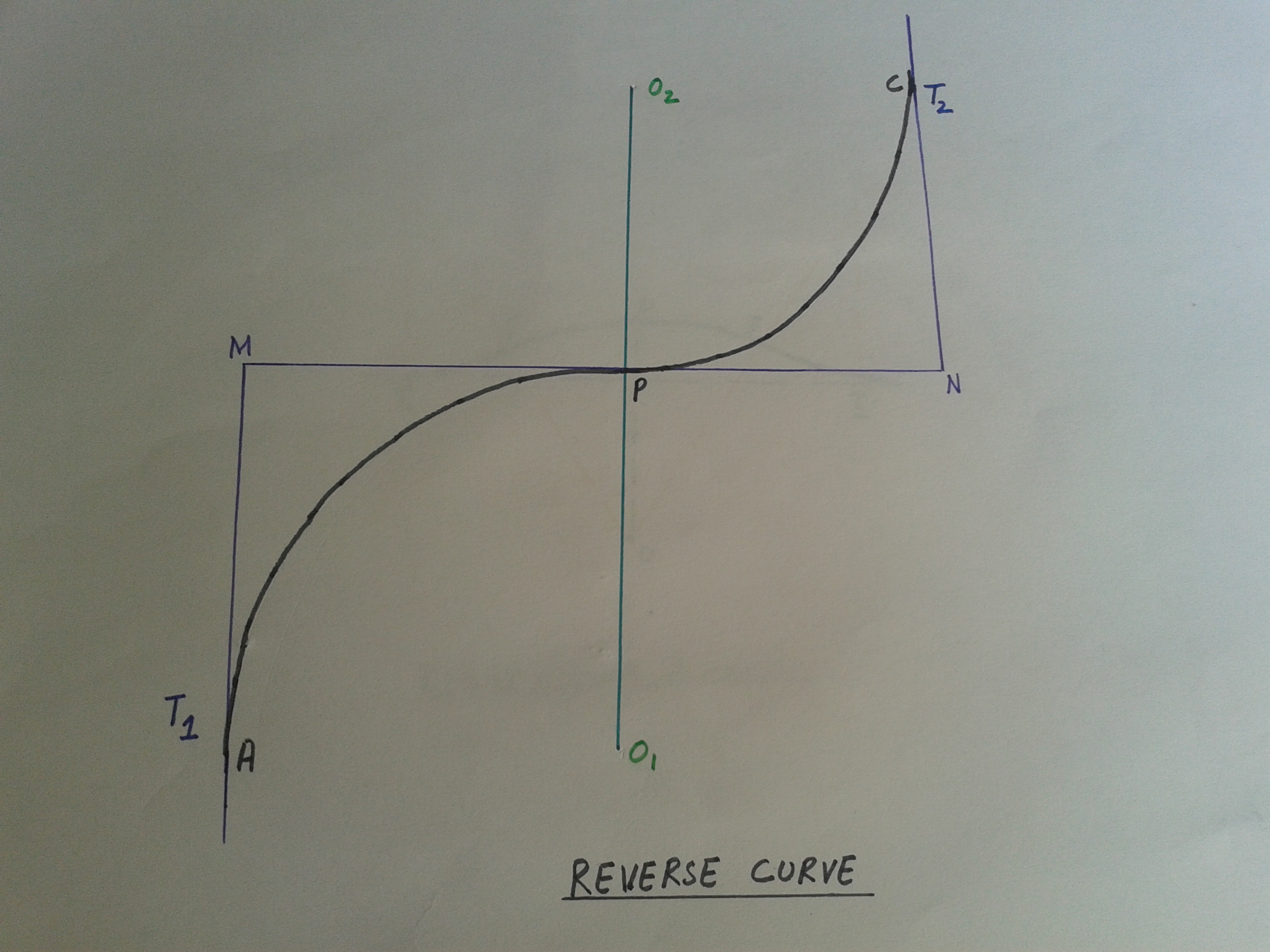
Diagram of reverse curve

Also called a serpentine curve, it is the reverse of a compound curve, and two simple curves bent in opposite directions are on opposite sides of the common tangent.

=== Deviation curve ===
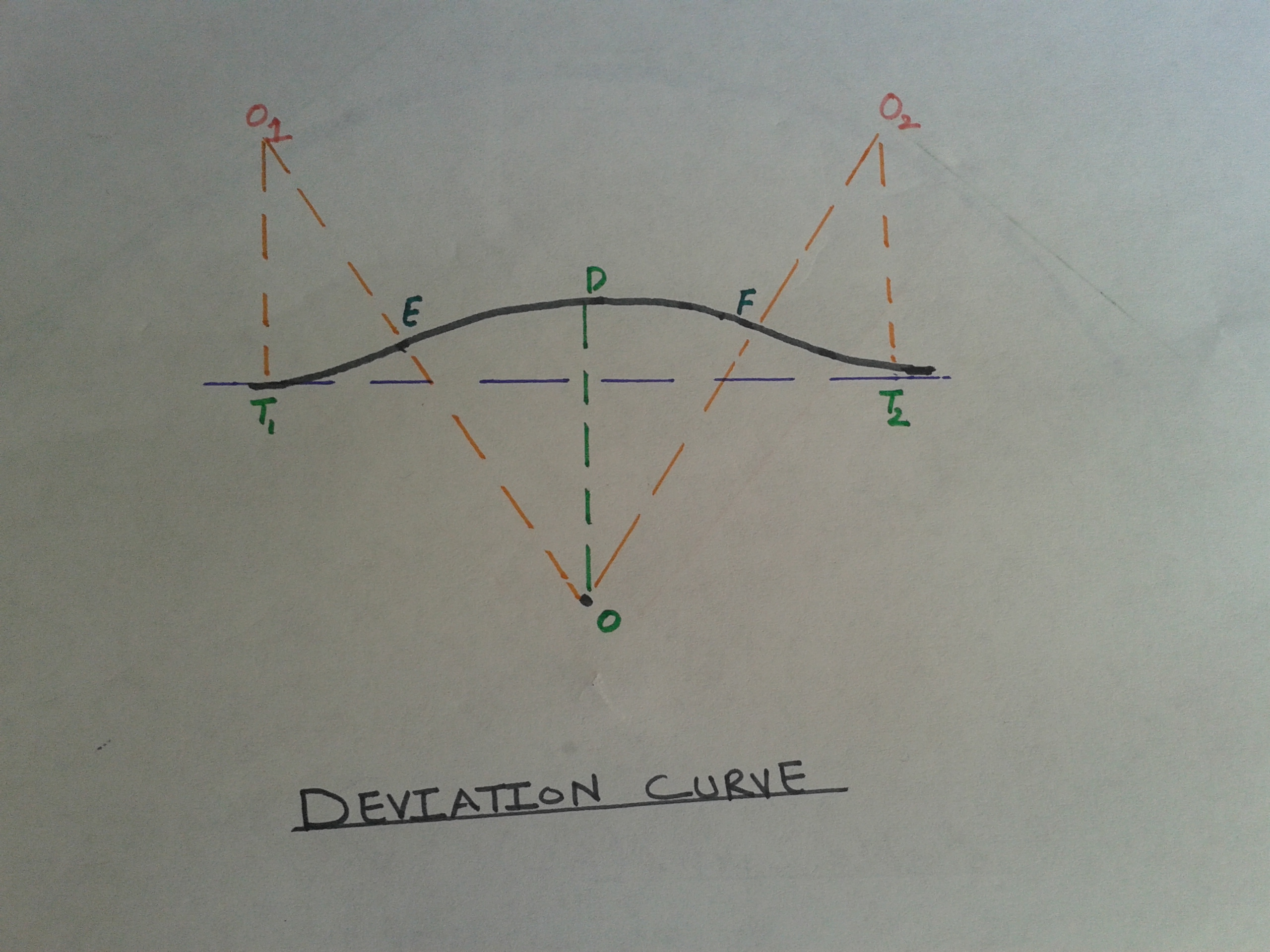
Diagram of deviation curve

A deviation curve is simply a combination of two reverse curves. It is used when it is necessary to deviate from a given straight path to avoid intervening obstructions such as a building, a body of water, or other significant site.

=== Transition curve ===
Is a curve with a gradual change in elevation on the outside of the curve to help drivers comfortably take turns at faster speeds

== Vertical road ==
=== Valley curve ===
Also called a sag curve, this curve dips down and then rises back up. These are placed in the base of hills. The opposite of summit curve.

=== Summit curve ===
Also called the crest curve, this curve rises and then dips down. At the peak of hills. The opposite of valley curve.

== See also ==
- Geometric design of roads
- Hairpin turn
- Ranging rods
- Survey camp
- Tape (surveying)
- Transition curve
