= Permanent adjustments of theodolites =

The permanent adjustments of theodolites are made to establish fixed relationship between the instrument's fundamental lines. The fundamental lines or axis of a transit theodolite include the following:-

- Vertical axis
- Axis of plate levels
- Axis of telescope
- Line of collimation
- Horizontal axis
- Axis of altitude bubble and the vernier should read zero.

These adjustments once made last for a long time. These are important for accuracy of observations taken from the instrument. The permanent adjustments in case of transit theodolite are:-

- Horizontal axis adjustment.

The horizontal axis must be perpendicular to the vertical axis.

- Vertical circle index adjustment.

The vertical circle must read zero when the line of collimation is horizontal.

- Adjustment of altitude level.

The axis of altitude level must be parallel to the line of collimation.

- Collimation adjustment.

The line of collimation or line of sight should coincide with axis of the telescope. The line of sight should also be perpendicular to the horizontal axis at its intersection with the vertical axis. Also, the optical axis, the axis of the objective slide, and the line of sight should coincide.

- Adjustment of horizontal plate levels.

The axis of plate levels must be perpendicular to the vertical axis.

== See also ==
- Temporary adjustments of theodolite
- Ranging rods
- Tape (surveying)
