= REEKON Tools =

American construction tool company

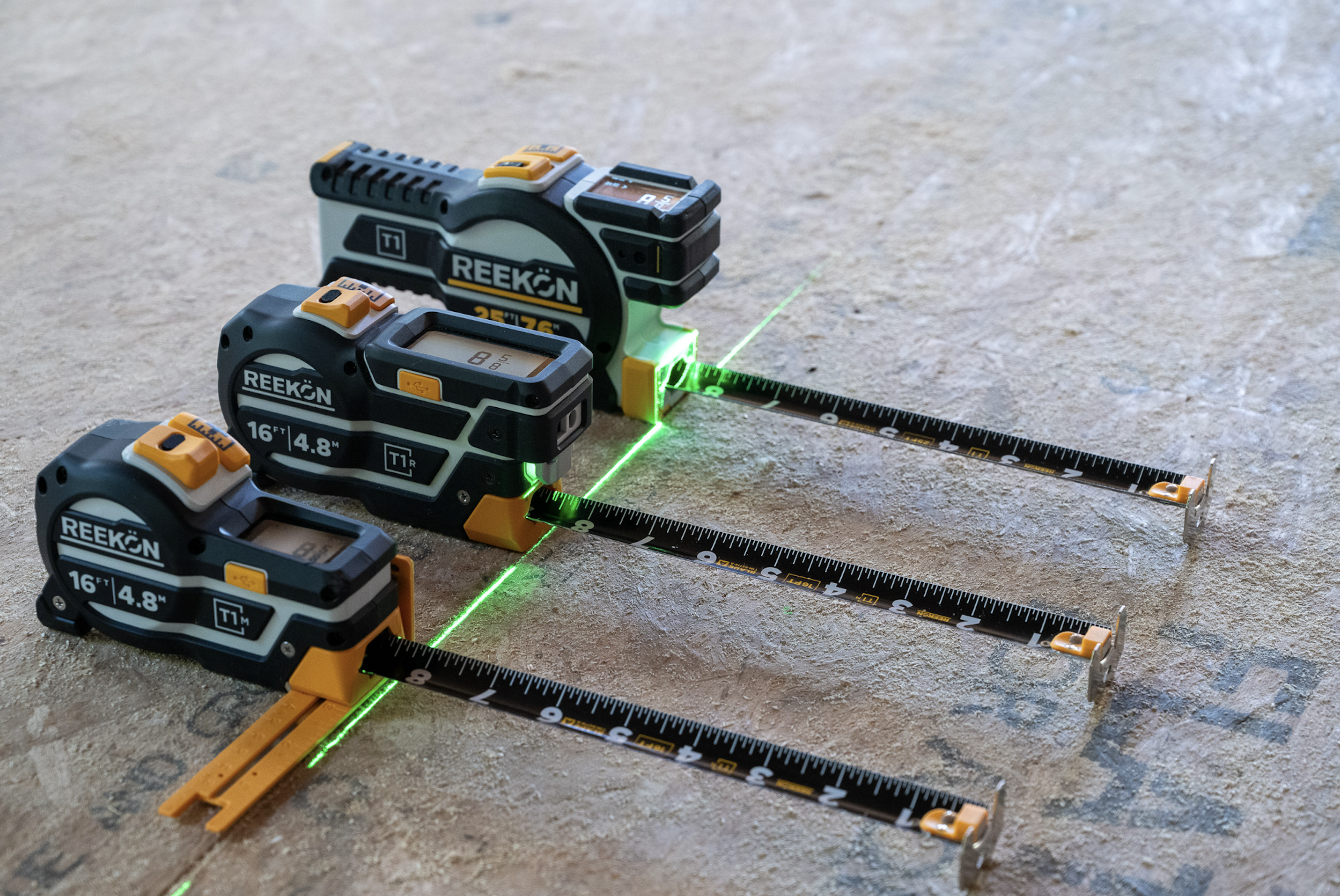
- Type: Private
- Industry: Construction tools, consumer electronics
- Founded: 2020; 6 years ago
- Founders: Christian Reed, Konstantinos Oikonomopoulos
- Headquarters: Boston, Massachusetts, United States
- Key people: Christian Reed (CEO)
- Products: Digital tape measures, measuring and layout tools, jobsite software
- Website: www.reekon.tools

Reekon Tools, stylized as REEKON Tools, is an American company based in Boston, Massachusetts, that designs and manufactures digital measuring and layout tools for the construction and building trades. Founded in 2020, the company is known for Bluetooth connected digital tape measures and related job site software, and has funded its products primarily through crowdfunding rather than venture capital.

== History ==
Reekon Tools was founded in 2020 by Christian Reed and Konstantinos "Kostas" Oikonomopoulos, who had previously worked together at the Somerville, Massachusetts, 3D printing company Formlabs. Reed, the company's chief executive, holds a degree in mechanical engineering from the Massachusetts Institute of Technology and previously served as a United States Army Reserve engineer. The company was started in Reed's basement in Chelsea, Massachusetts, and its early growth was aided by the rise in home-improvement activity during the COVID-19 pandemic.

The company's first product, the M1 Caliber, began as a side project and launched on Kickstarter in June 2020 with an initial goal of $10,000; it reached $100,000 in pledges within six hours and ultimately raised about $1.28 million. The company subsequently released additional tools and has continued to rely on crowdfunding and product sales rather than outside investment. By 2023 Reekon had about 13 full-time employees.

As of 2025, the company reported having sold more than 100,000 digital tape measures to customers including SpaceX, Steelcase, and Schneider Electric. Across its various crowdfunding campaigns the company has raised several million dollars in preorders. Reekon's products are manufactured overseas, including in China and Thailand; in 2025, amid changes in United States tariff policy, the company temporarily paused some new product manufacturing.

== Products ==
Reekon's product line centers on digital measuring tools that store measurements in on-board memory and can transmit data over Bluetooth to a companion smartphone application.

- M1 Caliber – the company's first product, a measuring attachment for miter saws that uses a spring-loaded wheel to measure material as it is fed under the tool.
- T1 Tomahawk – a digital tape measure with a digital display, on-board memory, and a green alignment laser.
- T1M Utility – a lower-cost compact digital tape measure.
- P1L Tagger – a handheld printer for producing labels used to identify materials on the jobsite.
- T1R Range – a hybrid tool combining a steel tape, a laser distance meter, and a level.

The company also develops software, marketed as Boldr Pro, that collects and organizes measurement data captured by its tools. Reekon products are sold directly and through retailers including The Home Depot, Lowe's, and Amazon.

== Awards and reception ==
The T1 Tomahawk digital tape measure was named to Time's list of the best inventions of 2022. In 2025, Reekon Tools was named a United States grand-prize winner of Alibaba.com's CoCreate Pitch competition. The company and its products have also been reviewed by trade and design publications including Core77, Family Handyman, and Pro Tool Reviews.
