= Prismatic compass =

Navigation and surveying instrument to measure magnetic bearing

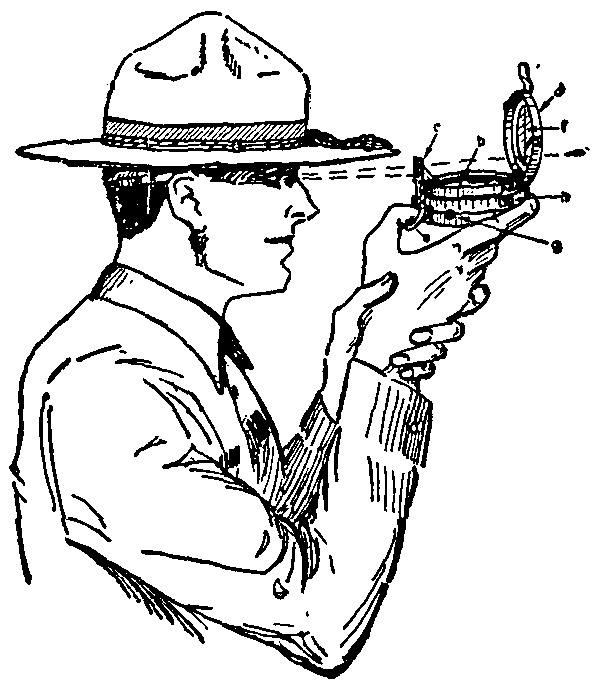
Soldier using a prismatic compass to get an azimuth

A prismatic compass is a navigation and surveying instrument which is extensively used to find out the bearing of the traversing and included angles between them, waypoints (an endpoint of the course) and direction. Compass surveying is a type of surveying in which the directions of surveying lines are determined with a magnetic compass, and the length of the surveying lines are measured with a tape or chain or laser range finder. The compass is generally used to run a traverse line. The compass calculates bearings of lines with respect to a magnetic needle. The included angles can then be calculated using suitable formulas in case of clockwise and anti-clockwise traverse respectively. For each survey line in the traverse, surveyors take two bearings that is fore bearing and back bearing which should exactly differ by 180^{°} if local attraction is negligible. The name Prismatic compass is given to it because it essentially consists of a prism which is used for taking observations more accurately.

== Least count ==
Least count means the minimum value that an instrument can read which is 30 minutes in case of prismatic compass. It means compass can read only those observations which are multiples of 30 minutes, 5^{°} 30^{'}, 16^{°} 00^{'}, 35^{°} 30^{'}, for example.

== Bearings ==
The compass calculates the bearings in whole circle bearing system which determines the angle which the survey line makes with the magnetic north in the clockwise direction. The whole circle bearing system also known as the azimuthal system varies from 0 degrees to 360 degrees in the clockwise direction. The included angles can be calculated by the formulas F-P ±180 in case of anti-clockwise traverse and P-F ±180 in case of clockwise traverse, where 'F' is the fore bearing of forward line in the direction of survey work and 'P' is the fore bearing of previous line.
