= Survey camp =

Civil engineering training course

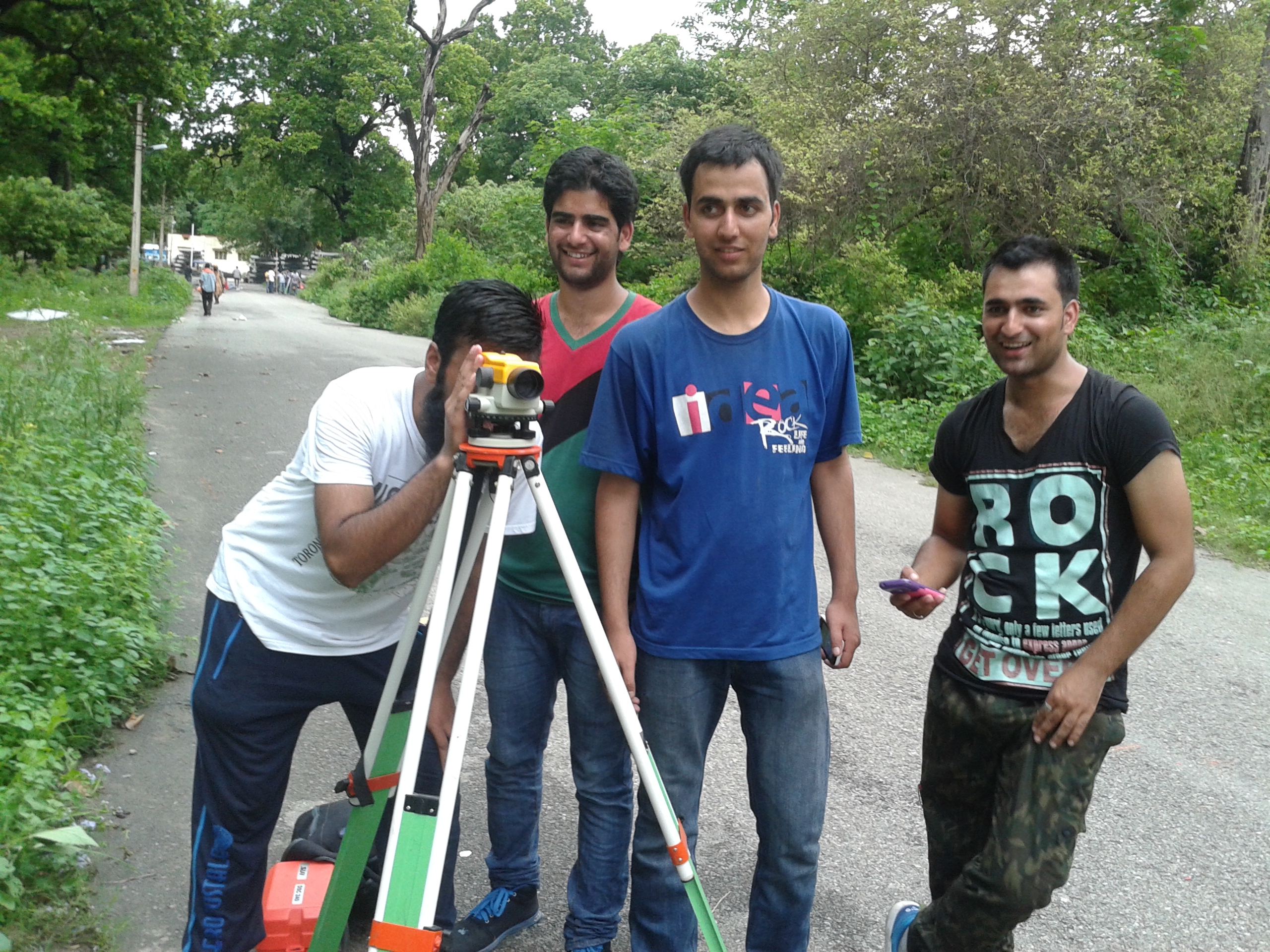
Students in survey camp in July 2014 in Haridwar, India

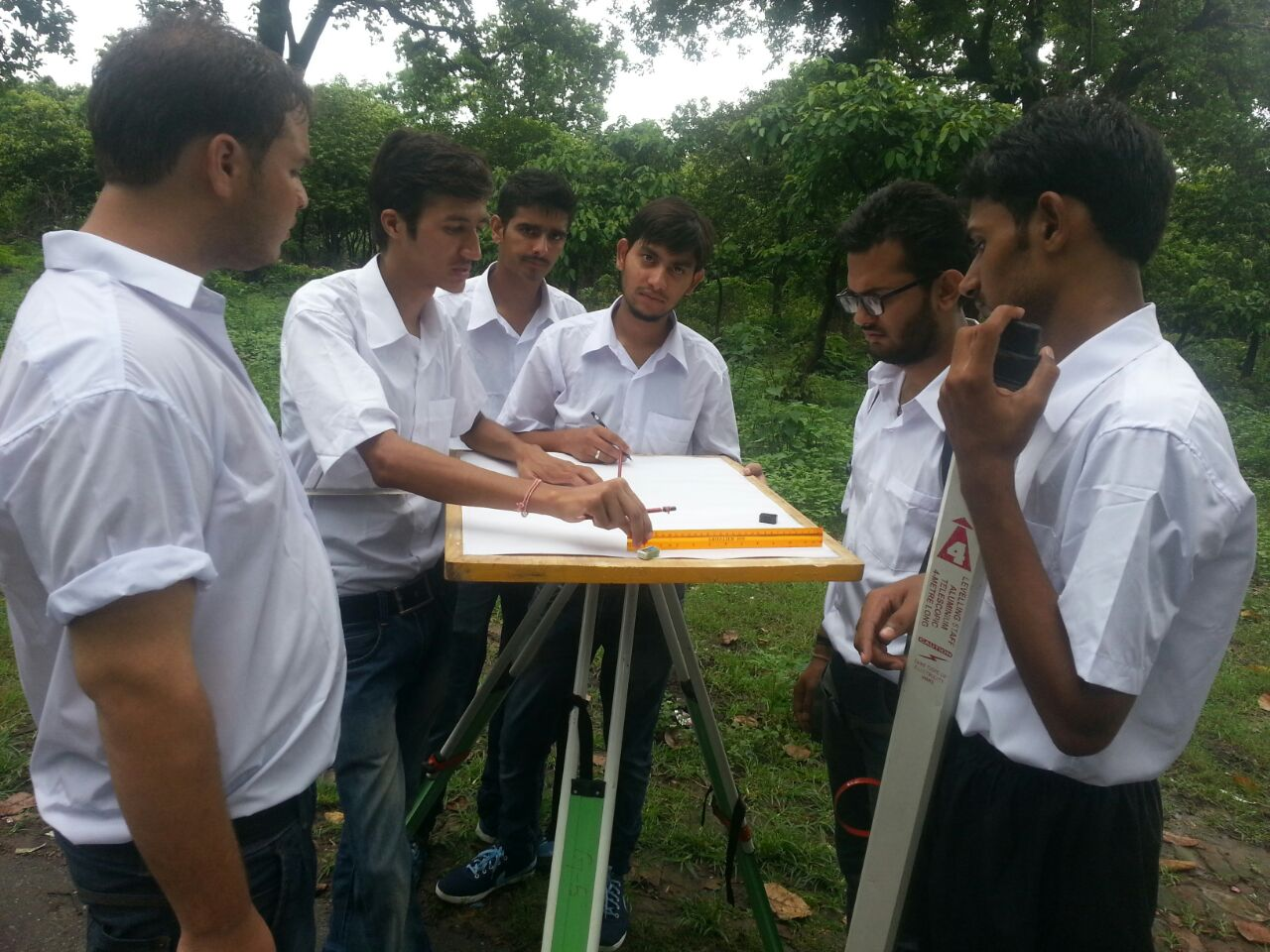
Students in survey camp doing a plane table survey in July 2014 in Haridwar, India

Survey camp is a traditional component of civil engineering training, where students do fieldwork to learn about surveying and related practices, such as developing maps. A version of survey camp remains part of the curriculum at schools including Texas A&M University, University of Toronto, Aryans College of Engineering (Rajpura), and General Sir John Kotelawala Defence University.

== History ==
Cornell University started requiring summer survey camp for civil engineering students in the 1870s and conducted it until the early 1960s.

The University of Wisconsin-Madison had a survey camp requirement from 1909 to 1972, because of the importance of surveying to civil engineering in the US military. Vanderbilt University had a summer school for surveying from 1927 to 1960. Tulane University had a summer survey camp from 1918 through the 1970s.

The University of Toronto camp was established in 1919-1920 and has been updated to include water quality sampling, among other topics.

== Subjects ==
In survey camp, students obtain hands-on experience in the use of surveying instruments. It can include project-based learning to support development of communication and problem-solving skills.

Students may also learn applications such as AutoCAD and Carlson Survey. The students use these programs to take data collected from the field to develop topographic maps of the particular area. The basic aim of the survey camp is to know various works carried out in the industrial field by surveying, which includes determining the topography of particular area with the help of survey work, map study and reconnaissance work.

== Instruments ==
The instruments used may include:

- Theodolite (transit)
- Total station and prism
- Compass (prismatic and surveyor)
- Ranging rods
- Measuring tape
- Level staff
- Tripod stand (for optical instruments)
- Level

== Practicals ==
The survey practicals generally performed in survey camp are:

1. Simple levelling
2. Fly levelling
3. Trigonometric levelling
4. To determine and draw RL's of longitudinal and cross section of road
5. Measuring horizontal angles by ordinary, repetition and reiteration methods
6. Compass traversing
7. Gale traverse
8. Topographic map preparation
