= Ranging rod =

Surveying instrument

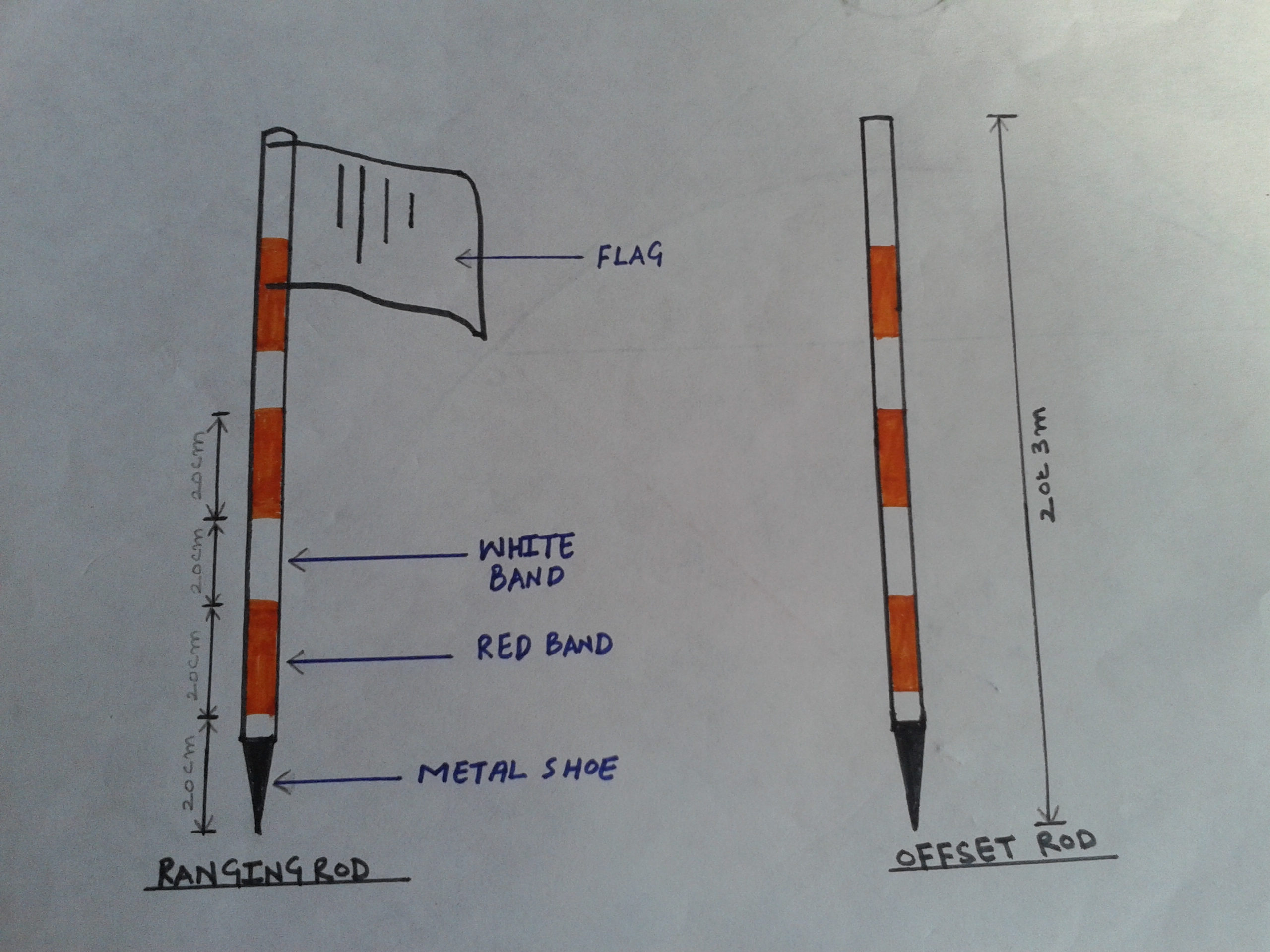
Ranging rod and Offset rod

A ranging rod, or range rod, is a surveying instrument used for marking the position of stations, and for sightings of those stations, as well as for ranging straight lines. Initially these were made of light, thin, and straight bamboo, or of well seasoned wood such as teak, pine, or deodar. They were shod with iron at the bottom and surmounted with a flag about 250 mm^{2} in size. Nowadays they are made of wood, metal, or fibreglass. The rods are usually about 30 mm in diameter and 2 or 3 m long, painted with alternating bands, such as red and white, red and yellow, or black and white, in lengths of 200 mm (i.e. one link length of metric chain), 500 mm, or 1 foot. These colours are used so that the rod can be properly sighted in case of long distance or bad weather. Ranging rods of greater length, e.g. 3 to 6 m, are called ranging or range poles, and are used for very long survey lines. Another type of ranging rod is known as an offset rod, which has no flag at the top. It is used for measuring small offsets from the survey line when the work is of an ordinary nature.

== Notes ==
When the ranging rods are limited, thin sticks 400 mm to 1 m length with white papers in the cuts at tops can serve their purpose. Such sticks are pointed at the bottom and are cut from wood. These are called as whites.

== See also ==
- Level staff
- Tape (surveying)
- Road curve
- Survey camp
