= Least count =

Smallest value a measuring instrument can measure

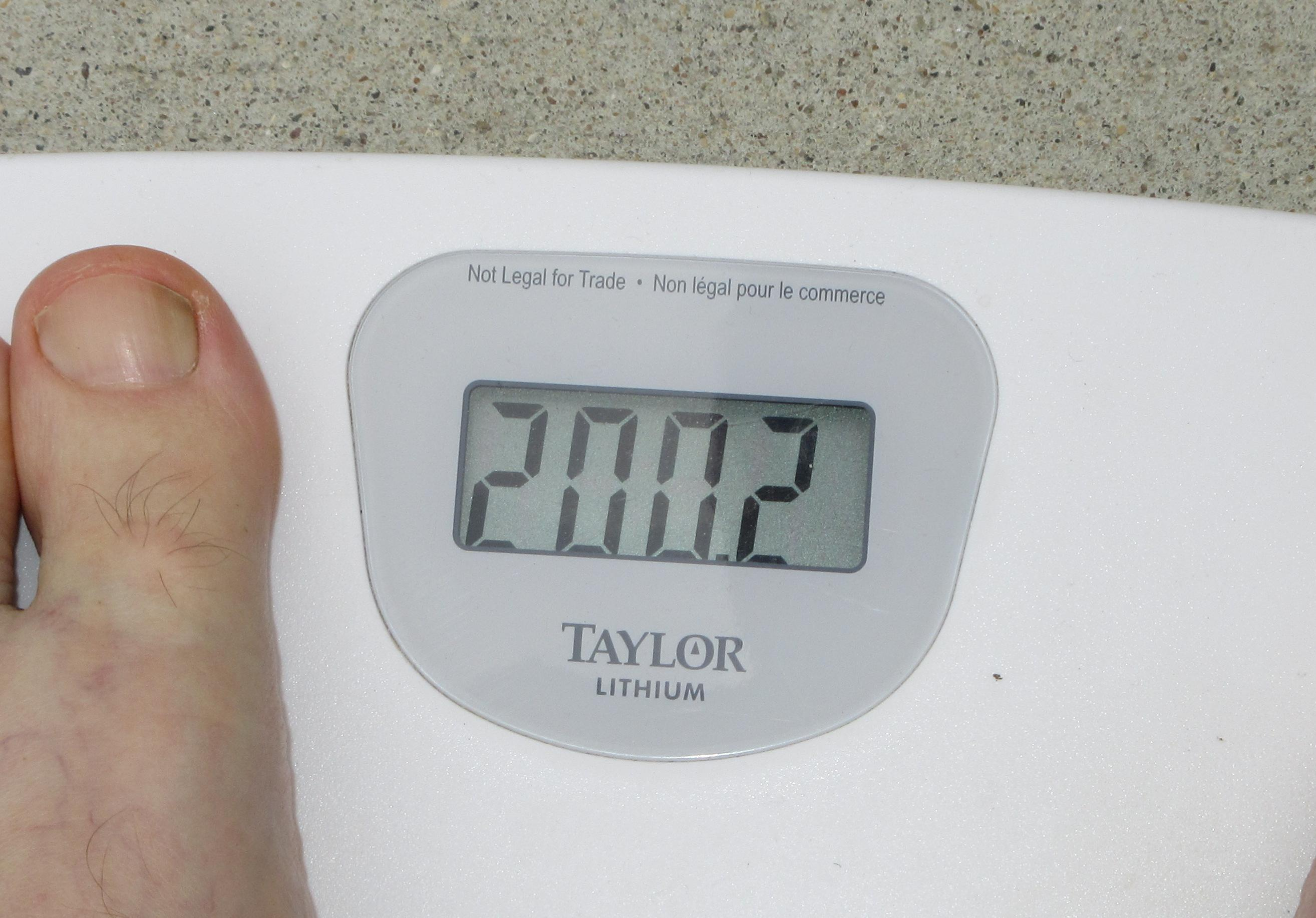
The dieter's problem: this scale can only resolve weight changes of 0.2 lbs, even though the digital display looks as if it could show 0.1

In the science of measurement, the least count of a measuring instrument is the smallest value in the measured quantity that can be resolved on the instrument's scale. The least count is related to the precision of an instrument; an instrument that can measure smaller changes in a value relative to another instrument, has a smaller "least count" value and so is more precise. Any measurement made by the instrument can be considered repeatable to no less than the resolution of the least count. The least count of an instrument is inversely proportional to the precision of the instrument.

For example, a sundial might only have scale marks representing hours, not minutes; it would have a least count of one hour. A stopwatch used to time a race might resolve down to a hundredth of a second, its least count. The stopwatch is more precise at measuring time intervals than the sundial because it has more "counts" (scale intervals) in each hour of elapsed time. Least count of an instrument is one of the very important tools in order to get accurate readings of instruments like vernier caliper and screw gauge used in various experiments.

Least count uncertainty is one of the sources of experimental error in measurements. The uncertainty of a digital instrument is its least count. Conversely, an electronic scale with a division scale of d=0.001 g has an uncertainty of ± 0.001 grams, as shown in “The dieter's problem” above. For example, if 0.04 g of substance was measured on the aforementioned electronic scale, the measurement can be noted as “0.04 g ± 0.001 g”.

== Least count error ==
The smallest value that can be measured by the measuring instrument is called its least count. Measured values are good only up to this value. The least count error is the error associated with the resolution of the instrument.

A metre ruler may have graduations at 1 mm division scale spacing or interval. A vernier scale on a caliper may have a least count of 0.1 mm while a micrometer may have a least count of 0.01 mm or 10 microns.

The least count error occurs with both systematic and random errors. Instruments of higher precision can reduce the least count error. By repeating the observations and taking the arithmetic mean of the result, the mean value would be very close to the true value of the measured quantity.

== See also ==
- Quantization
