= Local attraction =

Disturbing influence to a compass

While compass surveying, the magnetic needle is sometimes disturbed from its normal position under the influence of external attractive forces. Such a disturbing influence is called local attraction. The external forces are produced by sources of local attraction which may be current carrying wire (magnetic materials) or metal objects. The term is also used to denote amount of deviation of the needle from its normal position. It mostly causes errors in observations while surveying and thus suitable methods are employed to negate these errors.

== Sources ==
The sources of local attraction may be natural or artificial. Natural sources include iron ores or magnetic rocks while as artificial sources consist of steel structures, iron pipes, current carrying conductors. The iron made surveying instruments such as metric chains, ranging rods and arrows should also be kept at a safe distance apart from compass.

== Detection ==
Local attraction at a place can be detected by observing bearings from both ends of the line in the area. If fore bearing and back bearing of a line differ exactly by 180°, there is no local attraction at either station. But if this difference is not equal to 180°, then local attraction exists there either at one or both ends of the line.

== Remedies ==
There are two common methods of correcting observed bearings of the lines taken in the area affected by Local Attraction. The first method involves correcting the bearing with the help of corrected included angles and the second method involves correcting the bearing of traverse from one correct bearing (in which difference between fore bearing and back bearing is exactly equal to 180°) by the process of distribution of error to other bearings.
