= Tape measure =

Flexible ruler used to measure size or distance

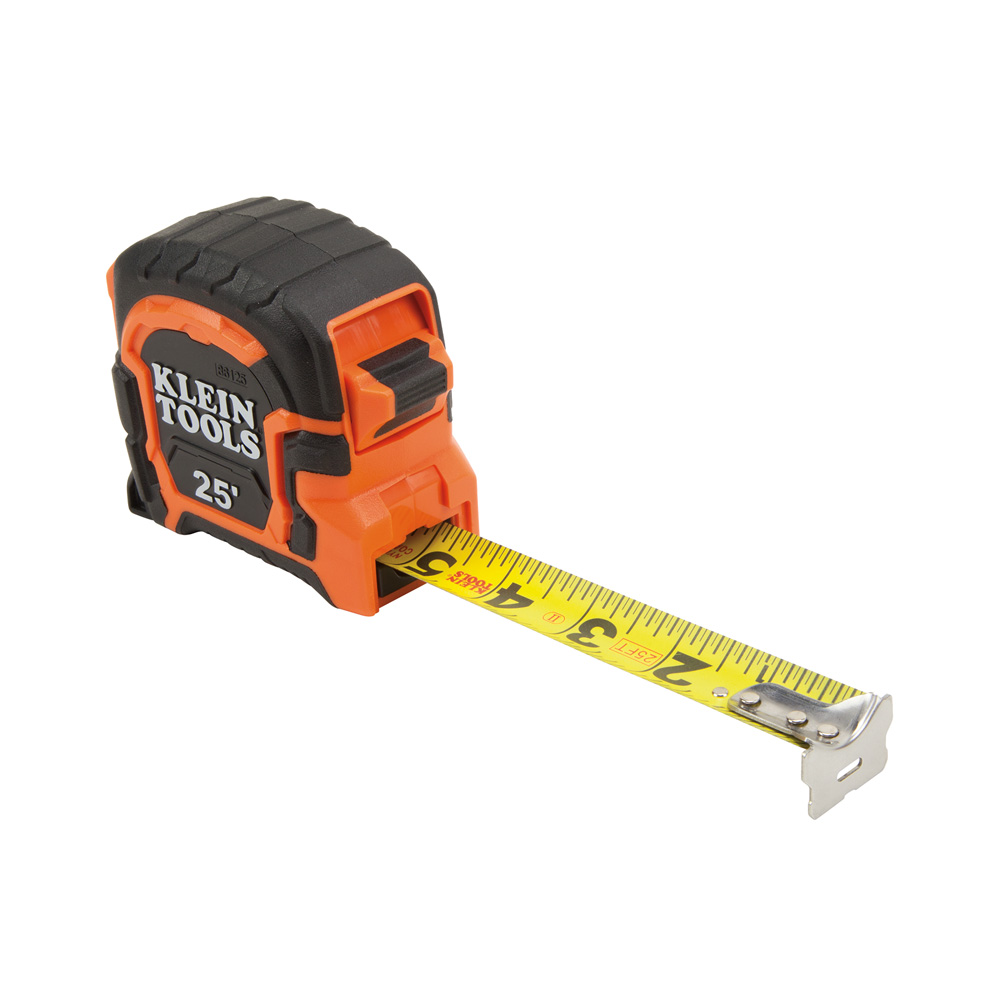
- Other names: Measuring tape, Sewing tape, Tape
- Classification: Hand tool
- Uses: Measuring length and distance
- Related: Ruler

Video of a tape measure being used

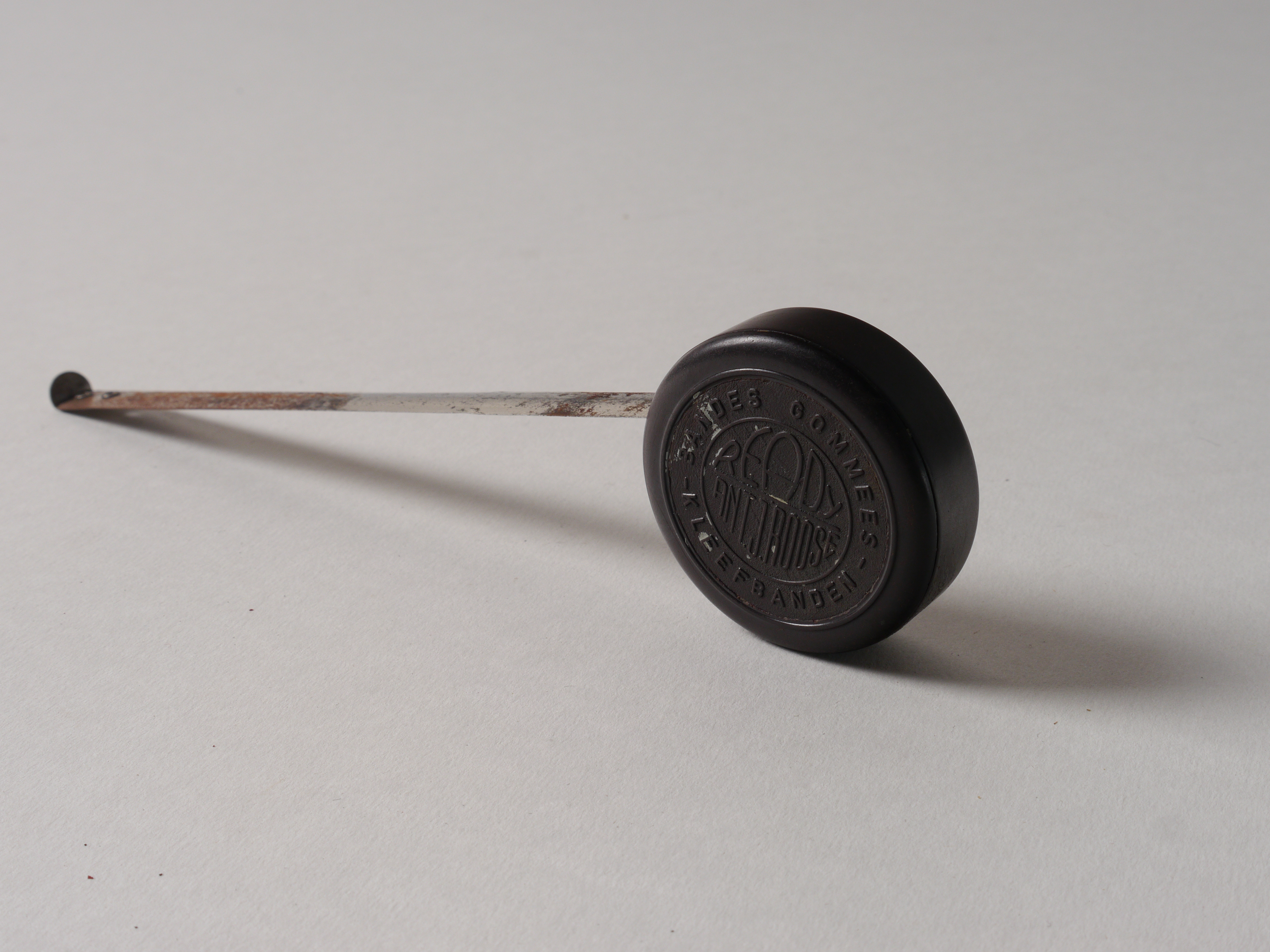
Tape measure with metal tape in a bakelite housing (from the collection of The Museum of Industry in Ghent)

A tape measure or measuring tape is a long, flexible ruler used to measure length or distance. It usually consists of a ribbon of cloth, plastic, fibreglass, or metal (usually - hard steel alloy) strip with linear measurement markings.

== Types ==
Tape measures are often designed for specific uses or trades. Tapes may have different scales, be made of different materials, and be of different lengths depending on the intended use.

Tape measures used in tailoring are called "sewing tape". Originally made from flexible cloth or plastic, fiberglass is now the preferred material due to its resistance from stretching or tearing. Sewing tape is mainly used for the measuring of the subject's waist line. Measuring tapes designed for carpentry or construction often use a curved metallic ribbon that can remain stiff and straight when extended, but can also retract into a coil for convenient storage. This type of tape measure will have a hook on the end to aid measuring. The hook is connected to the tape with loose rivets through oval holes, and can move a distance equal to its thickness, to provide both inside and outside measurements that are accurate. Self-marking tape measures include a graphite tip, enabling the user to make accurate markings.

Surveying requires the measuring of large distances and require an increased need for accuracy. Due to this, measuring tapes used for surveying may be made out of invar because of its low rate of thermal expansion.

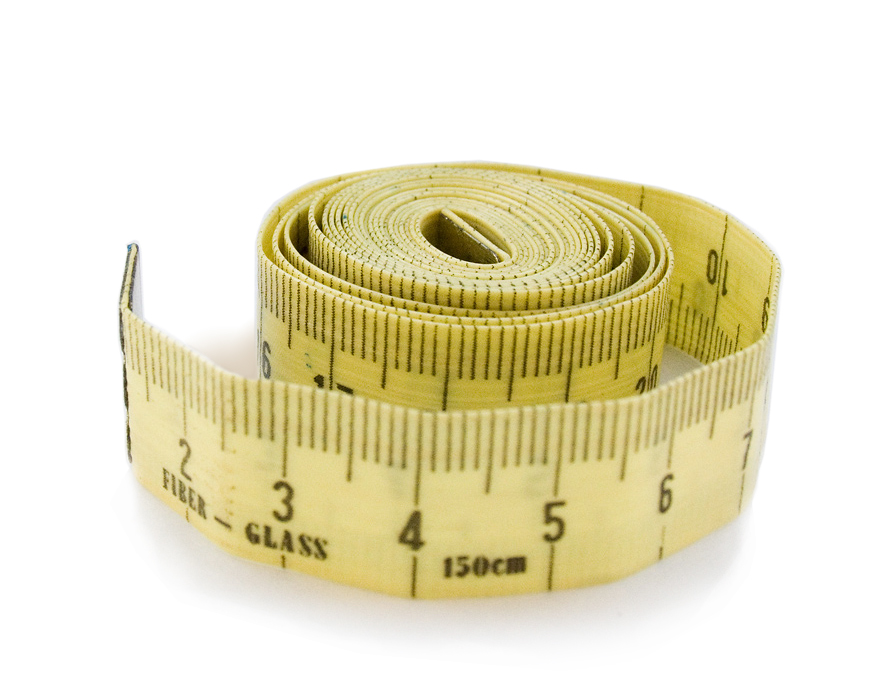
Fiberglass sewing tape

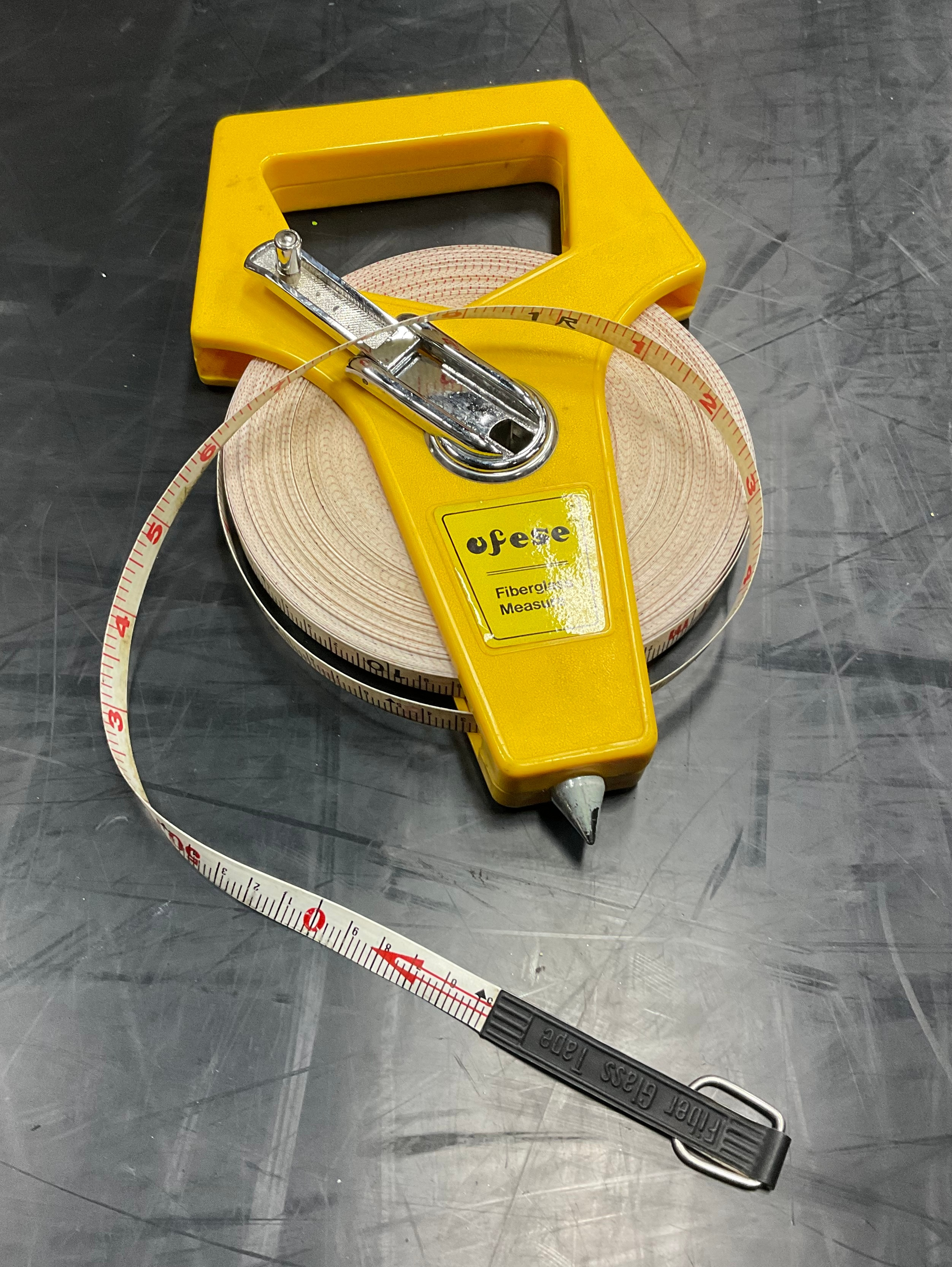
50 m tape for surveying

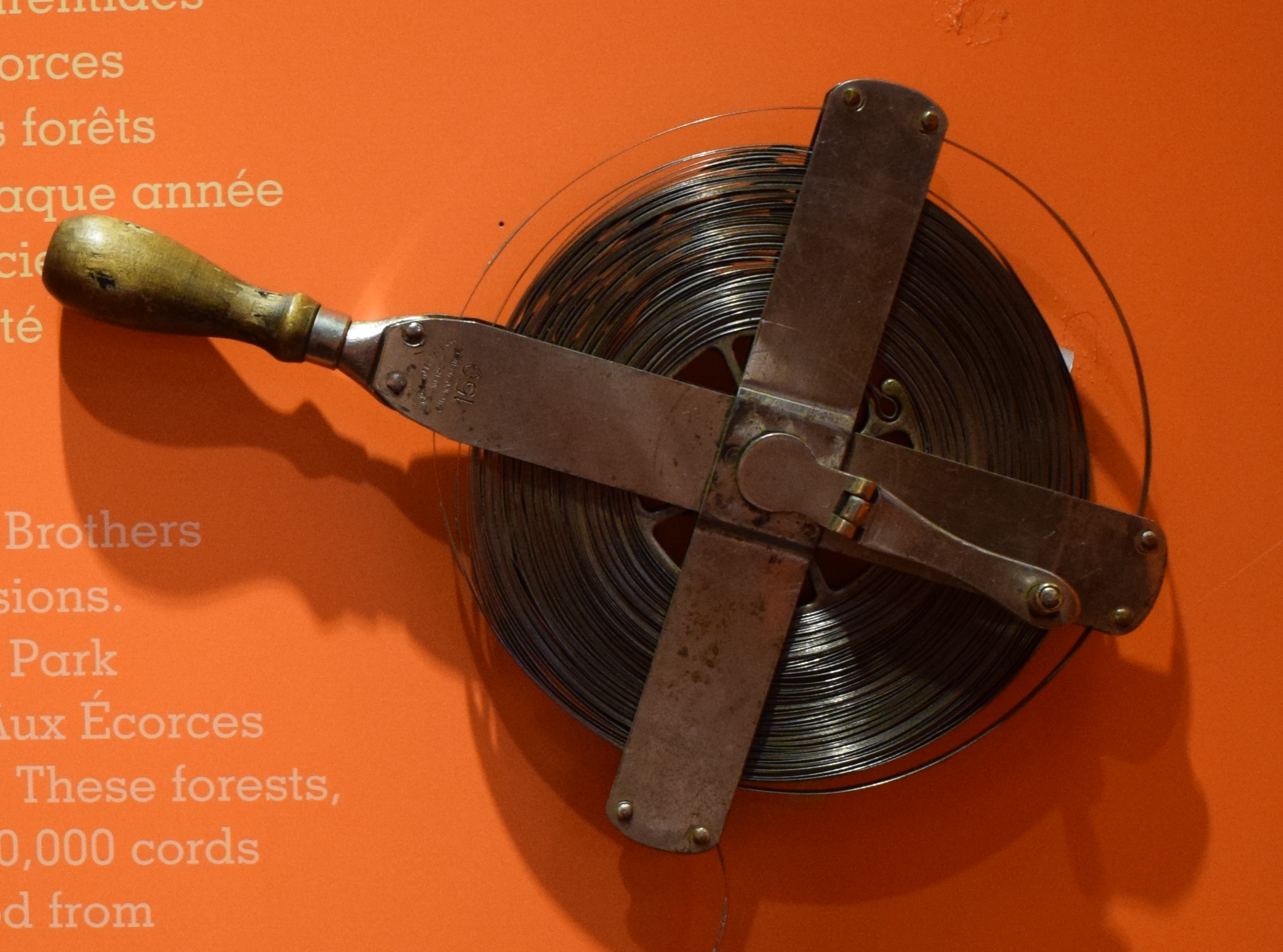
Steel measuring tape

=== Cased measuring tape ===
There are two basic types of cased measuring tapes: spring return tape measures and manual return tape measures. While spring return tape measures are compact and self-retracting, manual return measures are designed for longer distances and often require manual winding, often via hand crank.

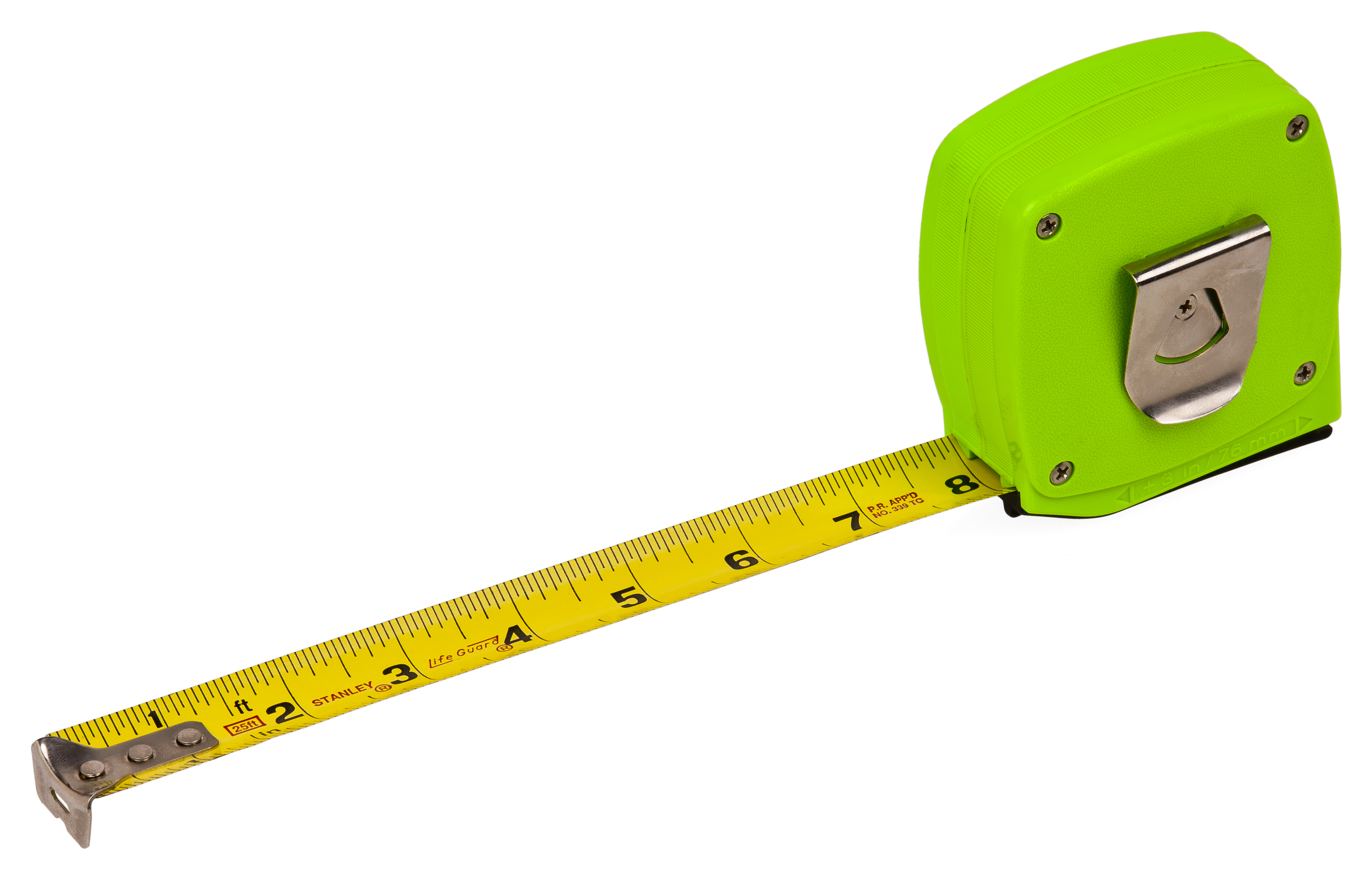
Self retracting measuring tape

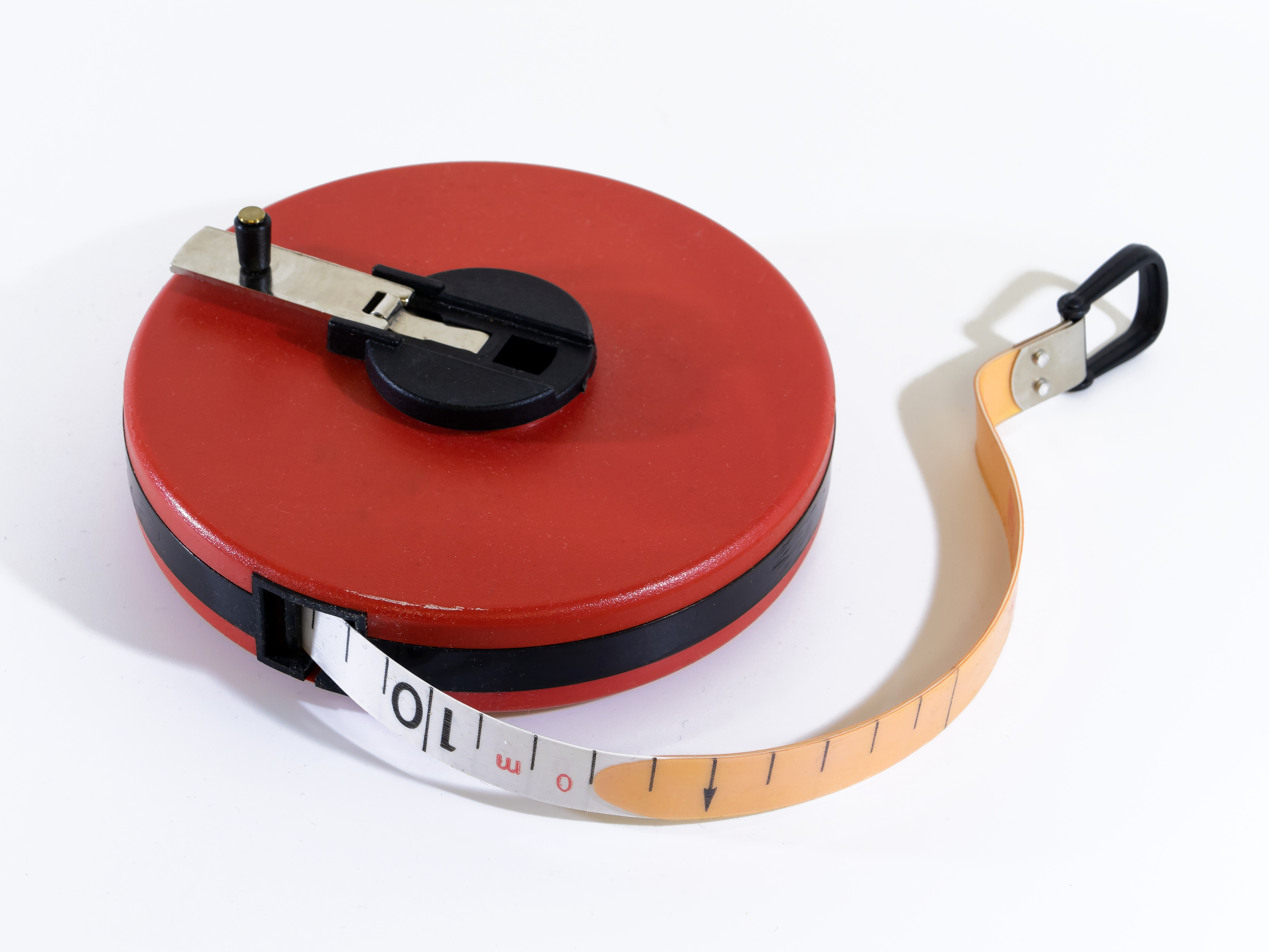
Manual return tape measure

== History ==
Prior to the advent of standardized measuring tapes, tailors employed cloth tapes without any markings. These tapes were manually inscribed with notches to denote specific measurements, enabling tailors to record the proportions of their clients.

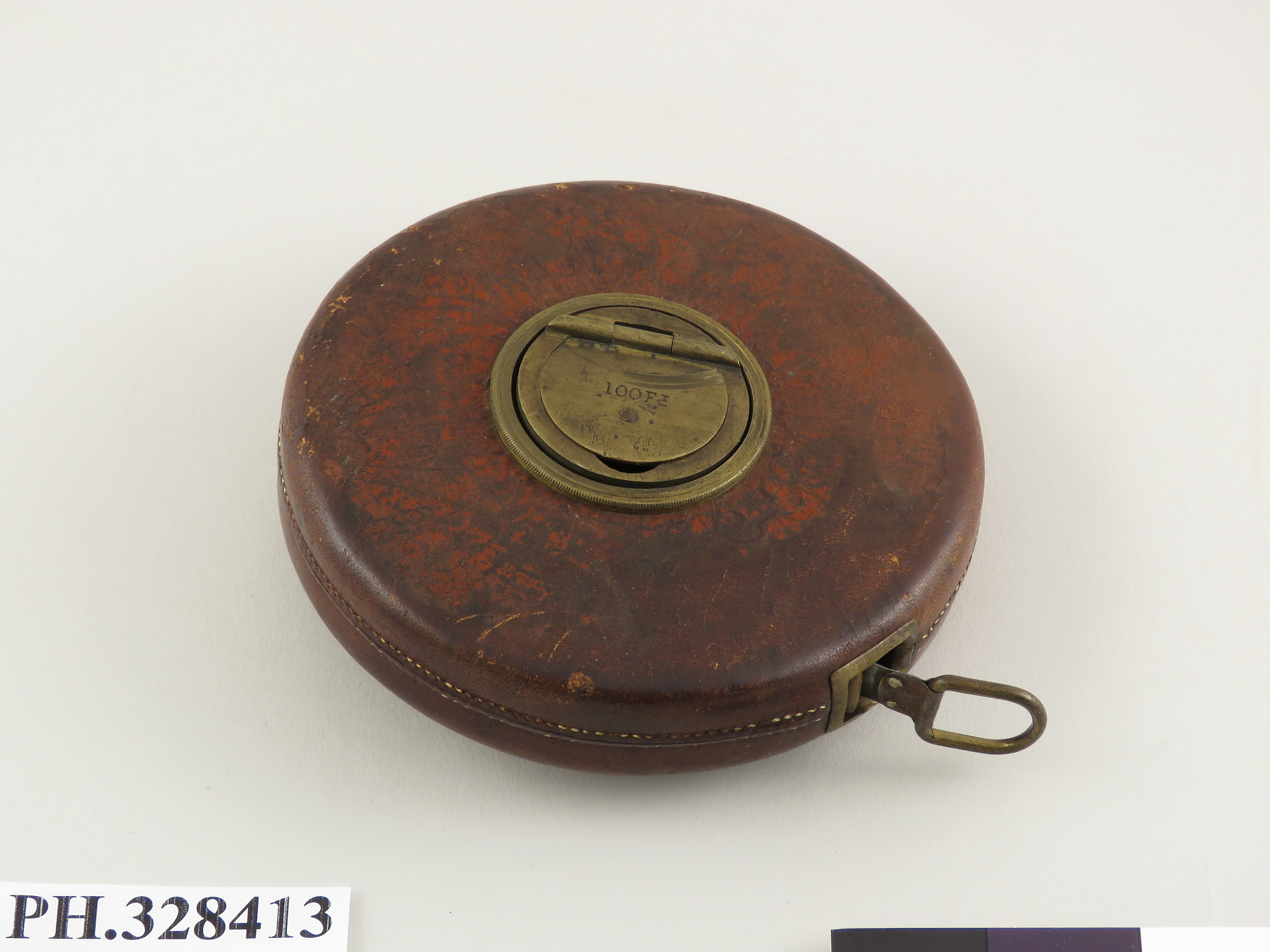
A Chesterman tape measure

James Chesterman, a British metalworker, is credited with the invention of the first retractable tape measure in 1821. His design consisted of a spring-loaded cloth strip with marked measurements, housed within a compact case. Building upon his prior design, Chesterman would patent the first steel tape measure. By capitalizing on the declining popularity of pannier dresses, Chesterman repurposed the surplus flat wire used in the dresses to create the flexible measuring tape.

On 6 December 1864, William H. Bangs received a patent for the first design of a spring return tape measure. Bang's design would later be improved upon by Alvin J. Fellows on July 14, 1868. Fellows' design differed from Bang's by allowing the tape to be held in place via a spring-click mechanism.

The first patented long tape measure in the United States was granted on 10 July 1860 to William H. Paine, and produced by George M. Eddy and Company. This design lacked any measurement points on it. Instead, it functioned as a singular unit of measurement, with the entire length of the tape representing a fixed distance. A brass piece, attached at the end of the tape, served as a reference marker. The length corresponding to the tape's full extension was then indicated on the case or crank mechanism.

Hiram A. Farrand with the Farrand Rapid Rule

In 1871, Justus Roe introduced a cost cutting technique to the tape measure. Employing rivets to attach small brass washers to the tape, he could mark inches and feet. To further enhance readability, small brass tags were affixed at five-foot intervals, each bearing a number indicating the total number of feet to that point. While this technique was not patented, Justus Roe and Sons popularized this design in their "Roe Electric Reel Tape Measures" during the late 19th and early 20th centuries. To compete with other products, they transitioned to etching or stamping increments and numbers directly onto the tape, eliminating the need for rivets and washers. The "electric" moniker was a marketing term and did not signify any electrical functionality.

On 3 January 1922, Hiram A. Farrand patented his concave-convex tape. The concave nature of his design allowed the tape to stay rigid, even when extended. Their product was later sold to Stanley Black & Decker.

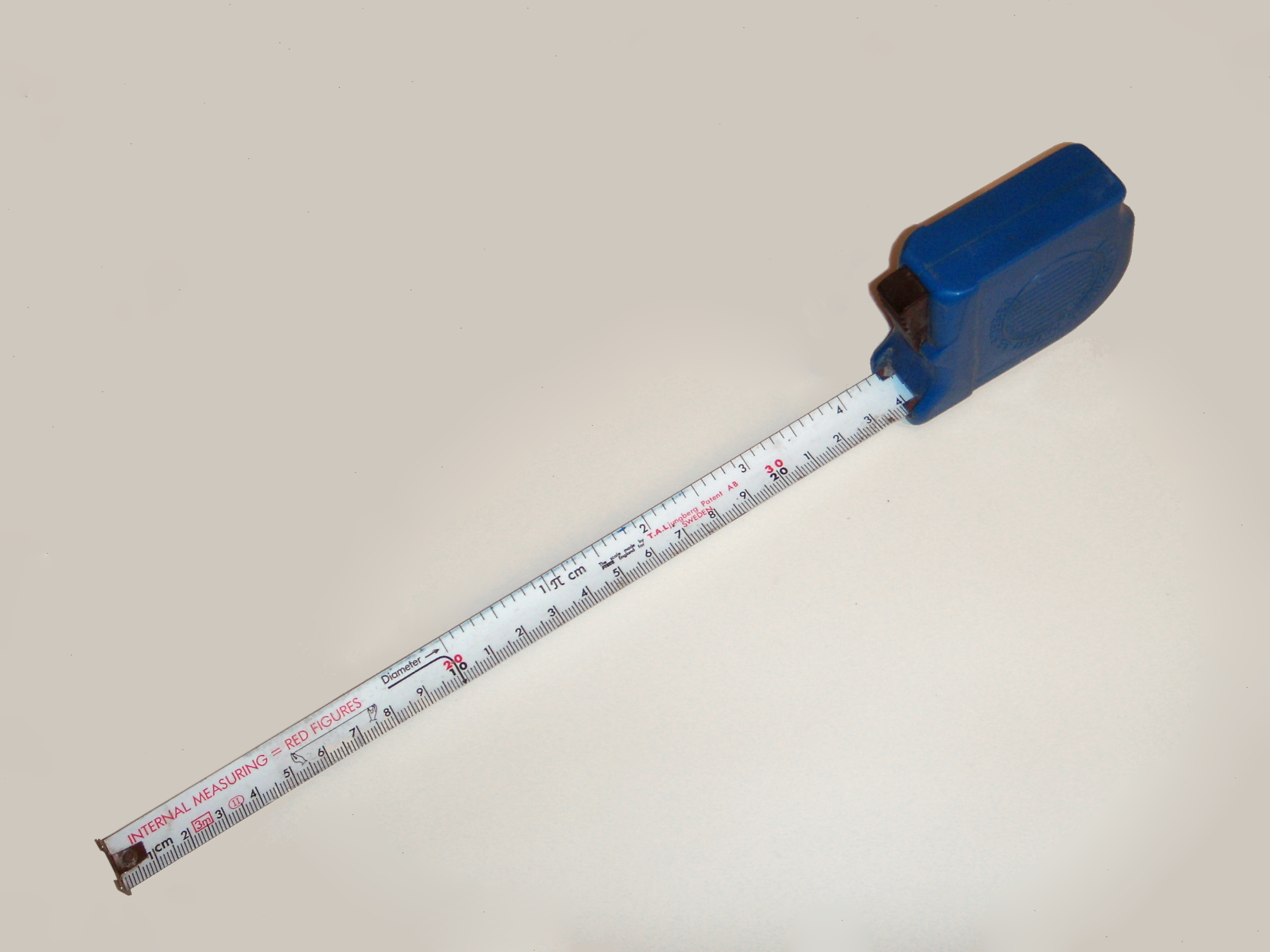
TALmeter showing the three scales on the measuring tape.

In 1947, the Swedish engineer Ture Anders Ljungberg began developing an improved version and in 1954 the TALmeter was introduced. It features edges at both the end of the tape and the mouth to cut marks so measures (including arcs) can be transferred without reading the scale, as well as a fold-out metal tongue at the rear, also with an edge, to be used when taking internal measures. The tape has three scales: the normal metric, the internal scale and a diameter scale used for instance to measure sheet metal to be rolled into a cylinder of a certain diameter. It was produced by his own company T A Ljungberg AB until 2005, when it was bought by Hultafors in 2005, who retained the name "Talmeter" for the product they now refer to as a märkmeter (marker-meter).

In March 1963, Stanley Tools introduced the PowerLock tape measure series. It was the first to use a molded ABS case, thumb actuated tape lock, and riveted end hook. By 1989, Stanley was producing more than 200,000 tape measures every day.

The first commercialized Digital Tape Measure was released by Starrett in 1995 under the DigiTape brand. It was further refined with added Bluetooth capability by REEKON Tools in 2023 by allowing measurements to be directly sent and shared across mobile devices and computers.

== Design ==
A loosely riveted hook lets a tape measure measure inner (1) and outer (2) lengths

The basic design on which all modern spring tape measures are built can trace its origins back to an 1864 patent by a Meriden, Connecticut resident named William H. Bangs Jr. According to the text of his patent, Bang's tape measure was an improvement on other versions previously designed.

The spring tape measure has existed in the U.S. since Bang's patent in 1864, but its usage did not become very popular due to the difficulty in communication from one town to another and the expense of the tape measure. In the late 1920s, carpenters began slowly adopting H. A. Farrand's design as the one more commonly used. Farrand's new design was a concave/convex tape made of metal which would stand straight out a distance of four to six feet. This design is the basis for most modern pocket tape measures used today.

With the mass production of the integrated circuit (IC) the tape measure has also entered into the digital age with the digital tape measure. Some incorporate a digital screen to give measurement readouts in multiple formats. An early patent for this type of measure was published in 1977.

There are also other styles of tape measures that have incorporated lasers and ultrasonic technology to measure the distance of an object with fairly reliable accuracy.

Tape measures often have black and red measurements on a yellow background as this is the optimal color combination for readability.

=== United States ===
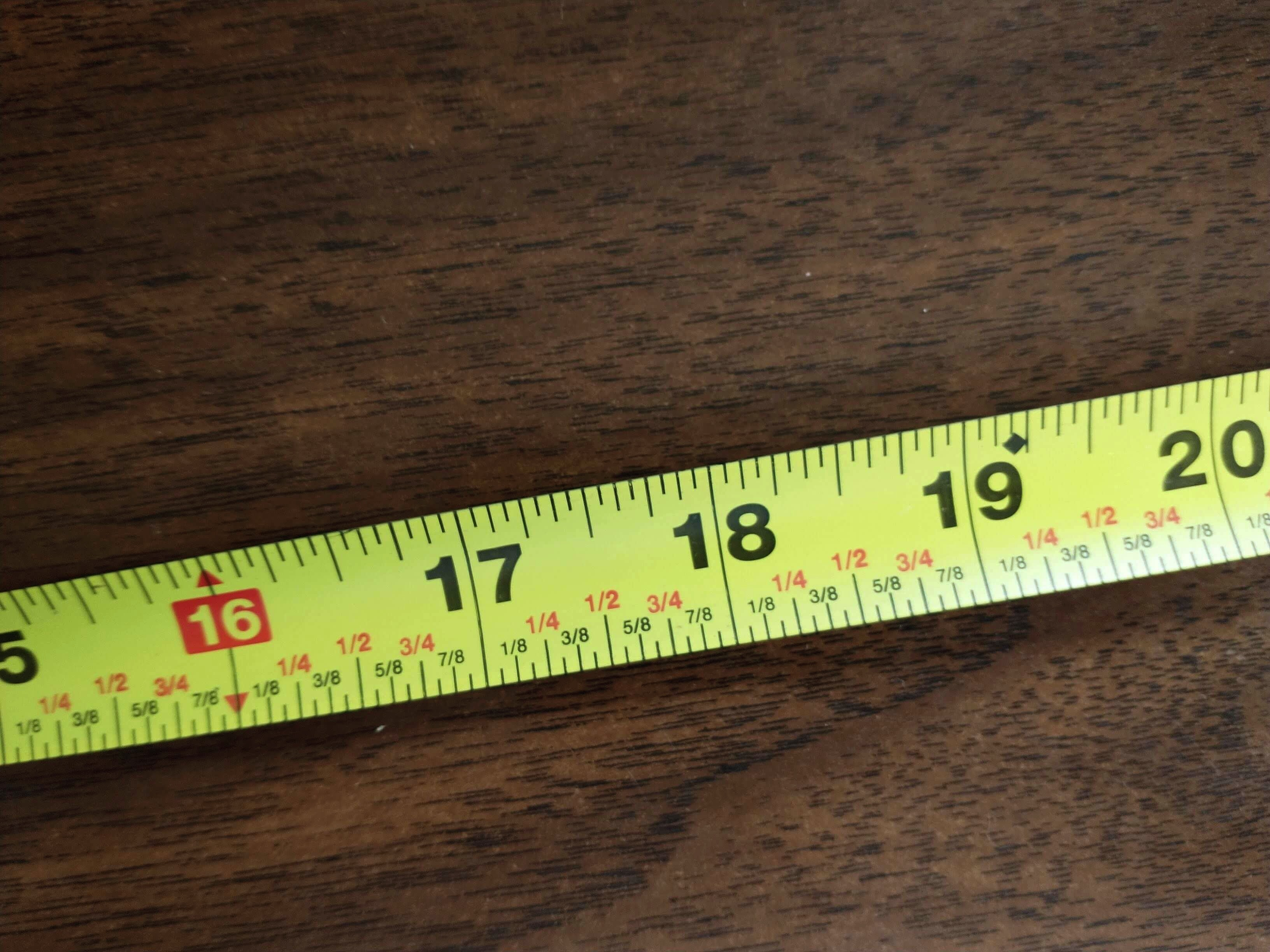
Tape measure with 16 and 19.2 inch marks

Most tapes sold in the United States are inches- and feet-based. Some tapes have additional marks in the shape of small black diamonds, appearing every 19.2 inches (488 mm), used to mark out equal spacing for joists (five joists or trusses per US standard 8-foot (2,438 mm) length of building material). Many US tapes also have special markings every 16 inches (406 mm), which is a US standard interval for studs in construction: three spaces of 16 inches make exactly 4 feet (1,219 mm) which is the US commercial width of a sheet of plywood, gyproc or particle board.

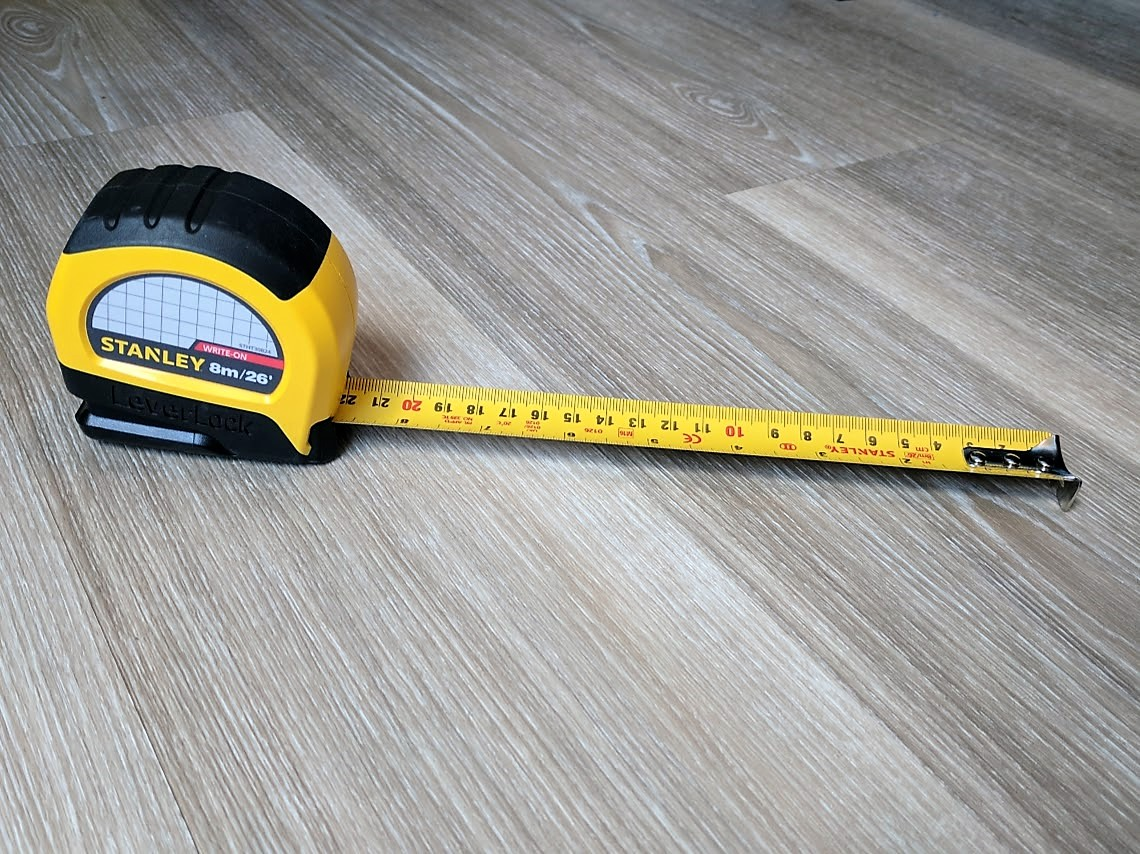
A dual scale inch/centimeter tape measure.

The sale of dual Metric/US Customary scale measuring tapes is slowly becoming common in the United States. For example, in some Walmarts there are Hyper Tough brand tapes available in both US customary units and Metric units. Unlike US rulers, of which an overwhelming majority contain both centimeter and inch scales, tape measures are longer and thus traditionally have had scales in both inches and feet & inches. So, the inclusion of a metric scale requires the measuring device either to contain 3 scales of measurement or the elimination of one of the US Customary scales.

The use of millimeter only tape measures for housing construction is a part of the US metric building code. This code does not permit the use of centimeters. Millimeters produce whole (integer) numbers, reduce arithmetic errors, thus decreasing wastage due to such errors. The US made measuring tape shown on the right is interesting in that it is a "Reverse Measuring Tape", where the measurements can be read from right to left just as well as they can be read when the tape is used from left to right.

As a curious fact, in 1956, Justus Roe, a surveyor and tape-maker by trade, made the 600 feet (183 m) gold-plated tape measure and, in a publicity gimmick, presented it to American professional baseball player Mickey Mantle.

=== Australia ===
The building industry was the first major industry grouping in Australia to complete its change to metric, being completed by January 1976.

In this, the industry was grateful to the SAA (now Standards Australia) for the early production of the Standard AS 1155-1974 "Metric Units for Use in the Construction Industry", which specified the use of millimetres as the small unit for the metrication upgrade. In the adoption of the millimetre as the "small" unit of length for metrication (instead of the centimetre), the Metric Conversion Board leaned heavily on experience in the UK and within the ISO, where this decision had already been taken.

This was formally stated as follows: "The metric units for linear measurement in building and construction will be the metre (m) and the millimetre (mm), with the kilometre (km) being used where required. This will apply to all sectors of the industry, and the centimetre (cm) shall not be used. … the centimetre should not be used in any calculation and it should never be written down".

The logic of using the millimetre in this context was that the metric system had been so designed that there would exist a multiple or submultiple for every use. Decimal fractions would not have to be used. Since the tolerances on building components and building practice would rarely be less than one millimetre, the millimetre became the sub-unit most appropriate to this industry.

Because of this, those in the building/construction industry mainly use millimetre only tapes. While dual scale tapes showing both inches and centimetres are sold, these are mainly imported low-cost items, since it would be a restraint of trade to not allow their importation.

=== United Kingdom ===
Tape measures sold in the UK often have dual scales for metric and imperial units. Like the American tape measures described above, they also have markings every 16 in (40.6 cm) and 19.2 in (48.8 cm).

=== Canada ===
Tape measures sold in Canada often have dual scales for metric and imperial units. All tapes in imperial units have markings every 16 in (40.6 cm), but not at every 19.2 in (48.8 cm). Home construction in Canada is largely, if not entirely, in imperial measure.

== Accuracy and standardisation ==
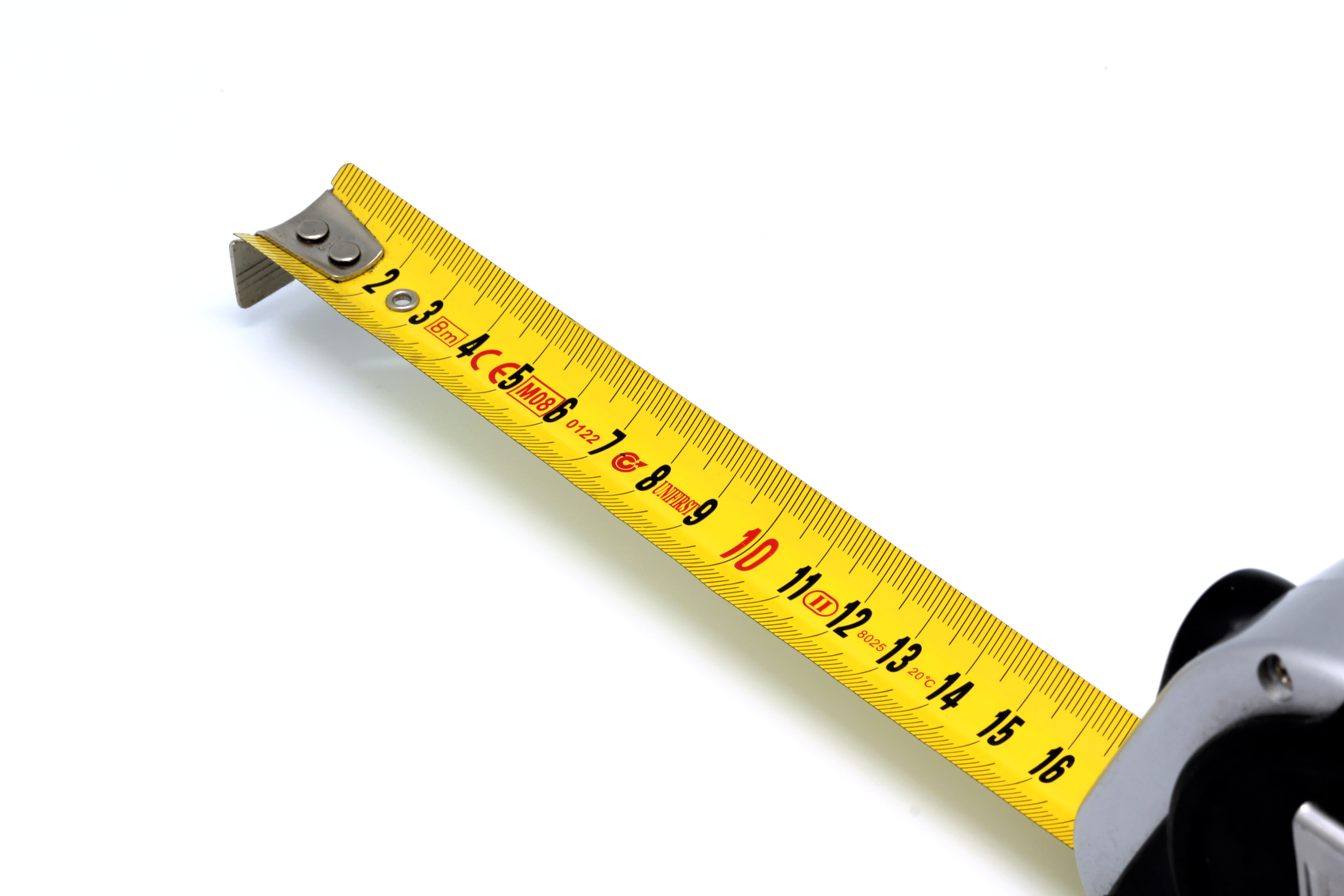
Red EC classification symbols printed on a Class II measure, calibrated at 20°C.

The accuracy of a tape measure is dependent on the ends of the tape and the markings printed onto the tape. The accuracy for the end of a retractable tape measure is dependent on the hook's sliding mechanism and thickness.

The European Commission (EC) has standardised a non-compulsory classification system for certifying tape measure accuracy, with certified tapes falling into one of three classes of accuracy: Classes I, II, and III. For example, under specific conditions the tolerances for 10 m long tapes are:

- Class I: accurate to ± 1.10 mm over 10 m length
- Class II: accurate to ± 2.30 mm over 10 m length
- Class III: accurate to ± 4.60 mm over 10 m length

If a tape measure has been certified then the class rating is printed onto the tape alongside other symbols including the nominal length of the tape, the year of manufacture, the country of manufacture, and the name of the manufacturer. For retractable tapes, Class I are the most accurate and tend to be the most expensive, while Class II tapes are the most common class available.

== See also ==
- Distance measurement
