= Timeline of estimates of Earth's figure =

This is a timeline of humanity's understanding of the figure of the Earth (its shape and size) from antiquity to modern scientific measurements. The Earth has the general shape of a sphere, more precisely an oblate spheroid due to the rotation of the planet. The Earth is an irregular figure because neither the interior nor the surface of the Earth are uniform. For simplicity, a reference ellipsoid is used to map the Earth horizontally, via a map projections. The latest international ellipsoid is GRS 80, with minor changes in WGS 84. The reference ellipsoid is also used to map the Earth vertically, by defining the geoid, an equigeopotential that best fits mean sea level. Further details are represented by terrain models or topographic maps on land an bathymetric charts on the ocean. The ocean dynamic topography is also mapped with respect to the geoid.

== Shape ==
From the apparent disappearance of mountain summits, islands, and boats below the horizon as their distance from the viewer increased, many ancient peoples understood that the Earth had some sort of positive curvature. Observing the ball-like appearance of the Moon, many ancient peoples thought that the Earth must have a similar shape. Around 500 BCE, Greek mathematician Pythagoras of Samos taught that a sphere is the "perfect form" and that the Earth is in the form of a sphere because "that which the gods create must be perfect." Although there were advocates for a flat Earth, dome Earth, cylindrical Earth, etc., most ancient and medieval philosophers argued that the Earth must have a spherical shape.

A rotating model of the Earth with the surface colored to show deviation of the geoid from a perfect oblate spheroid.

The Scientific Revolution of the 17th century provided new insights about Earth. In 1659, Dutch polymath Christiaan Huygens published De vi Centrifuga describing centrifugal force. In October 1666, English polymath Isaac Newton published De analysi per aequationes numero terminorum infinitas explaining his new calculus. In 1671, French priest and astronomer Jean-Félix Picard published Mesure de la Terre detailing his precise measurement of the Meridian of Paris. In November 1687, Newton first published Philosophiæ Naturalis Principia Mathematica explaining his three laws of motion and his law of universal gravitation. Newton realized that the rotation of the Earth must have forced it into the shape of an oblate spheroid. Newton made the assumption that the Earth was an oblate spheroid (correct) of essentially uniform density (incorrect) and used Picard's Mesure de la Terre and calculus to calculate the oblateness of the Earth from the ratio of the force of gravity to the centrifugal force of the rotation of the Earth at its equator as +0.434%, remarkably accurate given his assumptions.

In 1720, Jacques Cassini, director of the Paris Observatory, published Traité de la grandeur et de la figure de la terre. Cassini rejected Newton's theory of universal gravitation, after his (erroneous) measurements indicated that the Earth was a prolate spheroid. This dispute raged until the French Geodesic Mission to the Equator of 1735-1751 and the French Geodesic Mission to Lapland of 1736–1737 decided the issue in favor of Newton and an oblate spheroid. In 1738, Pierre Louis Maupertuis of the Lapland expedition published La Figure de la Terre, déterminée par les Observations, the first direct measurement of Earth's oblateness as +0.524%. Modern measurements of Earth oblateness are +0.335281% ± 0.000001%.

== Size ==
The pronouncement by Pythagoras (c.570-495 BCE) that the Earth was a sphere prompted his followers to speculate about the size of the Earth sphere. Aristotle (384–322 BCE) writes in De caelo, writes that "those mathematicians who try to calculate the size of the earth's circumference arrive at the figure 400,000 stadia." Archimedes (c.287-212 BCE) felt that the Earth must be smaller at about 300,000 stadia in circumference. These were merely informed guesses. Since the length of a stadion varied from place to place and time to time, it is difficult to say how much these guesses overstated the size of the Earth.

Eratosthenes (c.276-194 BCE) was the first to use empirical observation to calculate the circumference of the Earth. Although Eratosthenes made errors, his errors tended to cancel out to produce a remarkably prescient result. If Eratosthenes used a stadion of between 150.9 and 166.8 meters (495 and 547 feet), his 252,000-stadion circumference was within 5% of the modern accepted Earth volumetric circumference.

Subsequent estimates employed various methods to calculate the Earth's circumference with varying degrees of success. Some historians believe that the ever optimistic Christopher Columbus (1451–1506) may have used the obsolete 180,000-stadion circumference of Ptolemy (c.100-170) to justify his proposed voyage to India. Columbus was very fortunate that the Antilles were in his way to India.

It was not until the development of the theodolite in 1576 and the refracting telescope in 1608 that surveying and astronomical instruments attained sufficient accuracy to make precise measurements of the Earth's size. The acceptance of Newton's oblate spheroid in the 18th century opened the new era of Geodesy. Geodesy has been revolutionized by the development of the first practical atomic clock in 1955, by the launch of the first artificial satellite in 1957, and by the development of the first laser in 1960.

== Timeline ==
Historical estimates of the size of Earth as a sphere (Note: Ancient units of length such as the cubit, stadion, yojana, Roman mile, Arabic mile, Italian mile, or toise varied considerably by author, location, era, and use. The conversion to modern units used here are only approximations. Other assumptions will yield substantially different results. (Some modern authors will use a conversion that will best illustrate their point.))
Author	Year	Estimate	Deviation from WGS 84 (Note: Spherical deviations are calculated for a sphere of the same volume as the World Geodetic System 1984 (WGS 84) oblate spheriod model (1,083,207,320,000 km^{3}).)		
Author	Year	Circumference	Circumference	Surface area	Volume
Plato (Note: In De caelo, Aristotle writes that "those mathematicians who try to calculate the size of the earth’s circumference arrive at the figure 400,000 stadia." Prominent among those mathematicians was his tutor Plato.)	~387 BCE	400,000 stadia ~64,000 km (Note: The stadion was a unit of length used in ancient Greece that could range from about 150 to 210 meters (492 to 689 feet). This calculation assumes a stadion of 160 meters (524.9 feet).)	+60%	+156%	+309%
Aristotle	~350 BCE	400,000 stadia ~64,000 km	+60%	+156%	+309%
Eratosthenes of Cyrene	~250 BCE	252,000 stadia ~40,320 km	+0.7%	+1.5%	+2.2%
Archimedes of Syracuse	~237 BCE	300,000 stadia ~54,000 km	+35%	+82%	+145%
Posidonius of Apameia	~85 BCE	240,000 stadia ~38,400 km	-4.1%	-8.0%	-11.7%
Marinus of Tyre	~114	180,000 stadia ~28,800 km	-28%	-48%	-63%
Claudius Ptolemy	~150	180,000 stadia ~28,800 km	-28%	-48%	-63%
Aryabhata	~476	3,300 yojana ~26,400 km (Note: The yojana was a unit of length used in ancient India and Southeast Asia that could range from about 3,500 to 15,000 meters (11,483 to 49,213 feet). This calculation assumes a yojana of 8,000 meters (26,247 feet).)	-34%	-57%	-71%
Brahmagupta	~628	4,800 yojana ~38,400 km	-4.1%	-8.0%	-11.7%
Yi Xing	~726	128,300 lǐ ~56,869 km (Note: The lǐ is a Chinese unit of distance that varied from about 300 to 576 meters (984 to 1,890 feet). This calculation assumes a Tang dynasty distance of 443.25 meters (1,454.23 feet).)	+42%	+102%	+187%
Caliph al-Ma'mun	~830	20,400 Arabic miles ~40,253 km (Note: The Arabic mile was a historical Arabic unit of length that could range from about 1,800 to 2,000 meters (5,906 to 6,562 feet). This calculation assumes an Arabic mile of 1,973.2 meters (6,473.8 feet).)	+0.6%	+1.1%	+1.7%
al-Biruni	~1037	80,445,739 cubits ~36,201 km (Note: The cubit used by al-Biruni may have ranged from about 40 to 52 centimeters (15.7 to 20.5 inches). This calculation assumes a cubit of 45 centimeters (17.717 inches).)	-10%	-18%	-26%
Bhāskara II	1150	4,800 yojana ~38,400 km	-4.1%	-8.0%	-11.7%
Nilakantha Somayaji	1501	3,300 yojana ~26,400 km	-34%	-57%	-71%
Jean Fernel	1525	24,514.56 Italian miles ~39,812 km (Note: The Italian mile is an old Italian unit of distance equal to about 1,624 meters (5,328 feet).)	-0.546%	-1.089%	-1.629%
Jean Picard	1671	20,541,600 toises (Note: The toise is an old French unit of length equal to about 1.949 meters (6.394 feet).); 40,036 km 24,876 miles	+0.013%	+0.027%	+0.040%

Historical estimates of the size of Earth as a spheroid
Author	Year	Measurement		Deviation from WGS 84			
Author	Year	Circumference		Circumference		Surface area	Volume
Author	Year	Equatorial	Meridional	Equatorial	Meridional	Surface area	Volume
Isaac Newton (Note: In 1865, Isaac Newton calculated the oblateness of the Earth from the meridional circumference measurement of Jean-Félix Picard to be 3/692 ≅ 0.4335%. Newton later revised his calculation of oblateness of the Earth to 1/230 0.4347%. Had Newton known that the density of the Earth increased with depth, he would have calculated a smaller oblateness.)	1687, 1713, 1726	20,586,135 toises 40,122 km 24,931 miles	20,541,600 toises 40,036 km 24,876 miles	+0.118%	+0.069%	+0.203%	+0.305%
Jacques Cassini (Note: From his measurements of the meridional and latitudinal arcs of the Earth, Jacques Cassini calculated the dimension of the Earth as a prolate spheroid rather than an oblate spheroid.)	1720	20,541,960 toises 40,036 km 24,877 miles	20,554,920 toises 40,062 km 24,893 miles	-0.097%	+0.134%	+0.073%	+0.109%
Pierre Louis Maupertuis	1738	40,195 km 24,976 miles	40,008 km 24,860 miles	+0.300%	+0.206%	+0.475%	+0.713%
Plessis	1817	40,065 km 24,895 miles	40,000 km 24,854 miles	-0.025%	-0.020%	-0.043%	-0.065%
George Everest	1830	40,070 km 24,898 miles	40,003 km 24,857 miles	-0.013%	-0.012%	-0.024%	-0.027%
George Biddell Airy	1830	40,071 km 24,899 miles	40,004 km 24,858 miles	-0.009%	-0.008%	-0.017%	-0.026%
Friedrich Wilhelm Bessel	1841	40,070 km 24,899 miles	40,003 km 24,857 miles	-0.012%	-0.011%	-0.023%	-0.034%
Alexander Ross Clarke	1880	40,075.721 km 24,901.899 miles	40,007.470 km 24,859.489 miles	+0.001758%	-0.000982%	-0.000139%	-0.000219%
Friedrich Robert Helmert	1906	40,075.413 km 24,901.707 miles	40,008.268 km 24,859.985 miles	+0.000988%	+0.001012%	+0.002008%	+0.003012%
John Fillmore Hayford	1910	40,076.594 km 24,902.441 miles	40,009.153 km 24,860.535 miles	+0.003935%	+0.003225%	+0.006923%	+0.010382%
IUGG 24	1924	40,076.594 km 24,902.441 miles	40,009.153 km 24,860.535 miles	+0.003935%	+0.003225%	+0.006923%	+0.010382%
NAD 27	1927	40,075.453 km 24,901.732 miles	40,007.552 km 24,859.540 miles	+0.001088%	-0.000777%	-0.000312%	-0.000475%
Feodosy Krasovsky	1940	40,076.695 km 24,901.883 miles	40,008.550 km 24,860.160 miles	+0.001693%	+0.001717%	+0.003419%	+0.005128%
Irene Fischer	1960	40,075.130 km 24,901.531 miles	40,007.985 km 24,859.810 miles	+0.000282%	+0.000306%	+0.000597%	+0.000895%
WGS 66	1966	40,075.067 km 24,901.492 miles	40,007.911 km 24,859.764 miles	+0.000125%	+0.000121%	+0.000245%	+0.000368%
IUGG 67	1967	40,075.161 km 24,901.551 miles	40,008.005 km 24,859.822 miles	+0.000361%	+0.000355%	+0.000714%	+0.001070%
WGS 72	1972	40,075.004 km 24,901.453 miles	40,007.851 km 24,859.726 miles	+0.000031%	+0.000030%	+0.000061%	+0.000091%
GRS 80	1980	40,075.016685578 km 24,901.460896849 miles	40,007.862916921 km 24,859.733479555 miles	0.000000%	-0.000000126%	-0.000000168%	-0.000000252%
WGS 84	1984	40,075.016685578 km 24,901.460896849 miles	40,007.862917250 km 24,859.733479760 miles	WGS 84 reference			

=== WGS 84 ===
World Geodetic System 1984 (WGS 84) oblate spheroid model:

equatorial circumference (Note: The equatorial circumference of a spheroid is measured around its equator.) = 40,075.016685578 km = 24,901.460896849 miles
meridional circumference (Note: The meridional or polar circumference of a spheroid is measured through its poles.) = 40,007.862917250 km = 24,859.733479760 miles
volumetric circumference (Note: The volumetric circumference of an ellipsoid is the circumference of a sphere of equal volume as the ellipsoid.) = 40,030.178555815 km = 24,873.599774700 miles
oblateness (Note: The oblateness of a spheroid is the difference of its equatorial radius minus its polar radius divided by its equatorial radius.) = +0.335281066%
surface area = 510,065,622 km^{2} = 196,937,438 square miles
volume = 1,083,207,319,801 km^{3} = 259,875,256,206 cubic miles

== See also ==
- Arc measurement
- Figure of the Earth
  - Earth ellipsoid
  - Empirical evidence for the spherical shape of Earth
  - Flat Earth
  - Spherical Earth
- Geodesy
  - Earth's circumference
  - Earth radius
  - Geodetic datum
  - History of geodesy
  - World Geodetic System
