= Gladys West =

American mathematician (1930–2026)

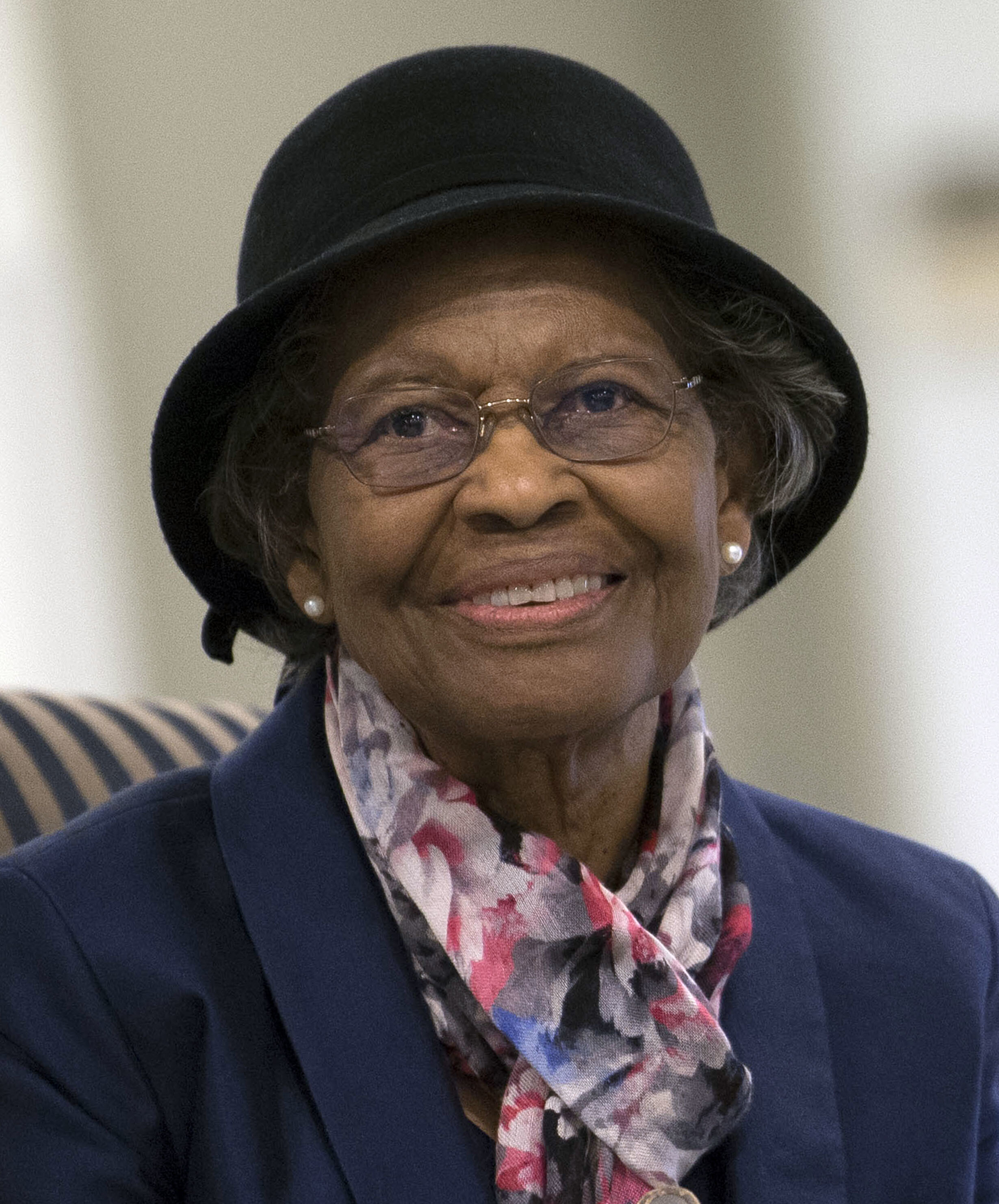
- West in 2018
- Born: Gladys Mae Brown; October 27, 1930; Sutherland, Virginia, U.S.
- Died: January 17, 2026 (aged 95); Fredericksburg, Virginia, U.S.
- Education: Virginia State University (BS, MS); University of Oklahoma (MPA); Virginia Tech (PhD)
- Known for: Satellite geodesy
- Spouse: Ira West (m. 1957; died 2024)
- Children: 3

Gladys Mae West (née Brown; October 27, 1930 – January 17, 2026) was an American mathematician. She was known for her contributions to mathematical modeling of the shape of the Earth, and her work on the development of satellite geodesy models, which were later incorporated into the Global Positioning System (GPS).

West was inducted into the United States Air Force Hall of Fame in 2018. She was awarded the Webby Lifetime Achievement Award for the development of satellite geodesy models.

== Early life and education ==
Gladys Mae Brown was born in Sutherland, Virginia, in Dinwiddie County, a rural county south of Richmond, on October 27, 1930. Her family was an African American farming family in a community of sharecroppers. She was the second of four children. She spent much of her childhood working on her family's small farm. As well as working on the farm, her mother worked in a tobacco factory and her father worked for the railroad. West saw education as her way to a different life.

At West's high school, the top two students from each graduating class received full scholarships to Virginia State College (Virginia State University, VSU), a historically black public university. West graduated as valedictorian in 1948, and received the scholarship. She was the first person in her family to attend college. At VSU, she chose to study mathematics, a subject that was mostly studied by men. She also joined the Alpha Kappa Alpha sorority. West graduated in 1952 with a Bachelor of Science degree in mathematics, and then taught mathematics and science for two years in Waverly, Virginia. West returned to VSU to complete a Master of Mathematics degree, graduating in 1955. Afterwards, she began another teaching position in Martinsville, Virginia.

== Career ==
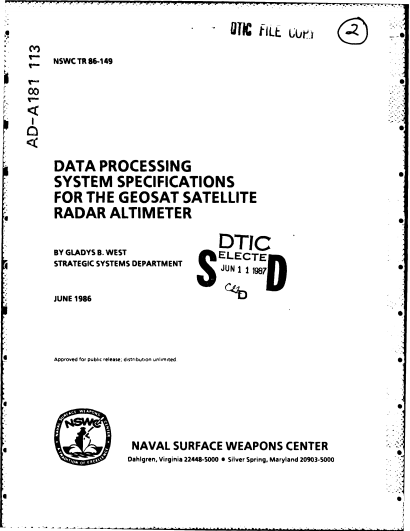
Data processing report for GeoSat by Gladys West

In 1956, West was hired to work at the Naval Proving Ground in Dahlgren, Virginia (later the Naval Surface Warfare Center). She was the second black woman hired and one of only four black employees. She was a computer programmer in the Dahlgren division, and a project manager for processing systems for satellite data analysis. Concurrently, West earned a master's degree in public administration from the University of Oklahoma.

In the early 1960s, West participated in an award-winning study that proved the regularity of Pluto's motion relative to Neptune. The project required five billion calculations conducted on a mainframe computer that used punched cards. Subsequently, West began to analyze satellite altimeter data from NASA's Geodetic Earth Orbiting program, to create models of the Earth's shape. She became project manager for the short-lived Seasat radar altimetry project, the first satellite that could remotely sense oceans. West's work cut her team's processing time in half, and she was recommended for a commendation in 1979.

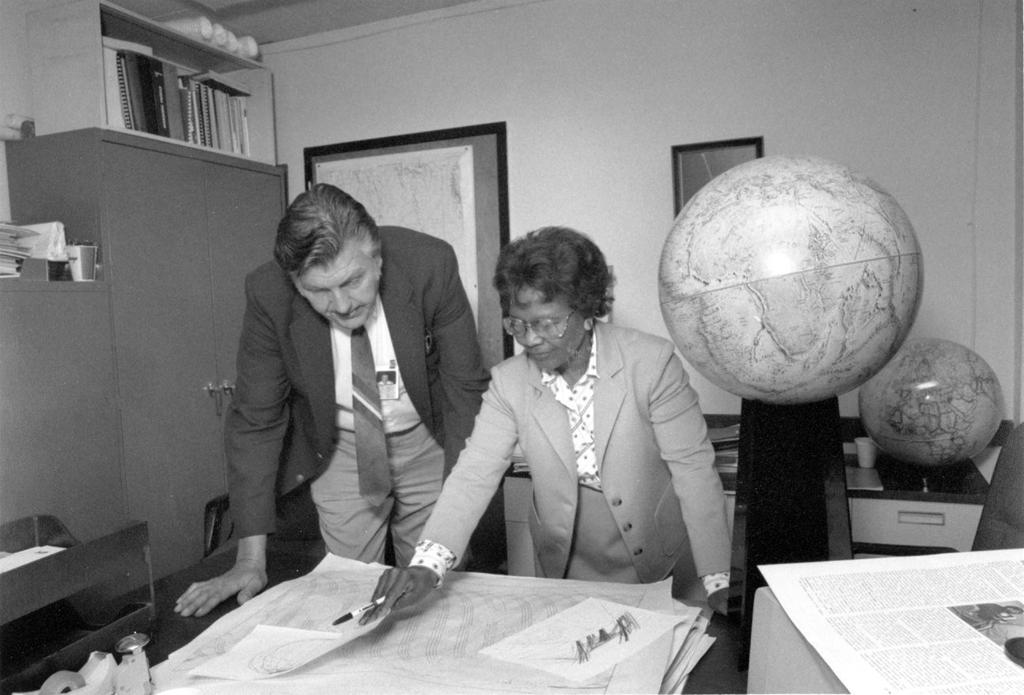
West and Sam Smith look over data from the Global Positioning System at Dahlgren in 1985

From the mid-1970s through the 1980s, West programmed an IBM 7030 Stretch computer to deliver increasingly precise calculations for the shape of the Earth, an ellipsoid with additional undulations known as the geoid. To generate an accurate geopotential model West needed to use complex algorithms to account for variations in the gravitational, tidal, and other forces that distort Earth's shape.

In 1986, West published Data Processing System Specifications for the Geosat Satellite Radar Altimeter, a 51-page technical report from the Naval Surface Weapons Center (NSWC). This explained how to improve the accuracy of geoid heights and vertical deflection, important components of satellite geodesy. This was achieved by processing data from the radio altimeter on the Geosat satellite, which went into orbit on March 12, 1984.

West worked at Dahlgren for 42 years, and retired in 1998. In 2000, she completed a PhD in Public Administration at Virginia Tech by distance learning.

West’s most prominent work concerned mathematical modeling of Earth’s geoid, or Earth’s precise shape and gravitational characteristics. Since Earth is not actually a sphere, precise navigation through space by satellites is the result of incredibly accurate geodetic models. West’s computations and data analysis produced these models, which would later become foundational toward the development of modern satellite navigation systems. It was her work that contributed directly to the accurate and reliable Global Positioning System (GPS). Without an effective Earth model, GPS satellites would make huge errors and be useless for navigation and mapping. West’s mathematical work enabled GPS systems to achieve the levels of precision that are necessary today.

== Personal life and death ==
West met her husband Ira at the Naval Surface Warfare Center Dahlgren Division, where he also worked as a mathematician. They were two of only four black employees at the time. They were married in 1957. They have three children and seven grandchildren. The West family went to chapel on the Proving Ground every Sunday. Her husband died on October 20, 2024.

The civil rights movement was fully underway during her time at the base. Though she supported the movement, she could not participate in protests because she was a government employee. In Boomtown, where married people lived on base, she was part of a club of black women who discussed civil rights topics.

During her career, West encountered many hardships because of racism against African Americans. A prime example was the lack of recognition she received while working, while her white coworkers received praise and added privileges. Her biography makes clear her disappointment at not being granted projects that included travel and exposure.

West continued to prefer using paper maps over GNSS-based navigation systems, saying: "I'm a doer, hands-on kind of person. If I can see the road and see where it turns and see where it went, I am more sure."

West died in Fredericksburg, Virginia, on January 17, 2026, at the age of 95.

== Legacy ==
West being inducted into the Air Force Space and Missile Pioneers Hall of Fame in 2018

West's vital contributions to GPS technology were recognized when Gwen James, a member of her sorority Alpha Kappa Alpha read a short biography West had submitted for an alumni function. Even West's own children did not previously know about their mother's role in creating GPS because West avoided talking about her work, much of which was classified as secret.

West was inducted into the United States Air Force Hall of Fame in 2018, one of the highest honors bestowed by Air Force Space Command (AFSPC). The AFSPC press release hailed her as one of "the 'Hidden Figures' part of the team who did computing for the US military in the era before electronic systems", a reference to the 2016 book by Margot Lee Shetterly, which was adapted into the film Hidden Figures. Captain Godfrey Weekes, commanding officer at the Naval Surface Warfare Center Dahlgren Division, described the role played by West in the development of Global Positioning System: "She rose through the ranks, worked on the satellite geodesy, and contributed to the accuracy of GPS and the measurement of satellite data. As Gladys West started her career ... in 1956, she likely had no idea that her work would impact the world for decades to come". West was the project manager in the development of Seasat, the first satellite that monitored the oceans. Her research continued with programming an IBM 7030 Stretch Computer used to create a geodetic model of the shape of the Earth. West agreed, saying "When you're working every day, you're not thinking, 'What impact is this going to have on the world?' You're thinking, 'I've got to get this right.'"

As an alumna of Virginia State University, West was named Female Alumna of the Year at the Historically Black Colleges and Universities Awards in 2018.

West was selected by the BBC as part of their 100 Women of 2018. In 2021, the UK's Royal Academy of Engineering awarded her the Prince Philip Medal, its highest individual honor.

In 2024, Virginia's Fredericksburg City School Board voted to name its third elementary school in her honor, Gladys West Elementary School. West was awarded the Institute of Electrical and Electronics Engineers' President's Award in 2024. Her contributions to the leading science were later valorized in an obituary published in the leading scientific journal Nature.

== Publications ==
- West, Gladys B. (1979). "Smoothing of Geos 3 satellite radar altimeter data". Journal of Geophysical Research. 84 (B8). American Geophysical Union (AGU): 4055. Bibcode:1979JGR....84.4055W. doi:10.1029/jb084ib08p04055. ISSN 0148-0227.
- SEASAT Satellite Radar Altimetry Data Processing System (Technical report). Dahlgren, Virginia: Naval Surface Weapons Center. May 1981. NSWC TR 81-234, DTIC ADA115972 – via Defense Technical Information Center.
- West, Gladys B. (July 10, 1982). "Mean Earth ellipsoid determined from SEASAT 1 altimetric observations". Journal of Geophysical Research: Solid Earth. 87 (B7). American Geophysical Union (AGU): 5538–5540. Bibcode:1982JGR....87.5538W. doi:10.1029/jb087ib07p05538. ISSN 0148-0227.
- Data Processing System Specifications for the GEOSAT Satellite Radar Altimeter (Technical report). Dahlgren, Virginia: Naval Surface Weapons Center. NSWC TR 86-149, DTIC ADA181113 – via Defense Technical Information Center.

== See also ==
- Irene Fischer
- List of African-American women in STEM fields
