= Spherical Earth =

Approximation of the figure of Earth as a sphere

Image from space: The spherical surface of planet Earth

Spherical Earth or Earth's curvature refers to the approximation of the figure of the Earth as a sphere. The earliest documented mention of the concept dates from around the 5th century BC, when it appears in the writings of Greek philosophers. In the 3rd century BC, Hellenistic astronomy established the roughly spherical shape of Earth as a physical fact and calculated the Earth's circumference. This knowledge was gradually adopted throughout the Old World during Late Antiquity and the Middle Ages, displacing earlier beliefs in a flat Earth. A practical demonstration of Earth's sphericity was achieved by Ferdinand Magellan and Juan Sebastián Elcano's circumnavigation (1519–1522).

The realization that the figure of the Earth is more accurately described as an ellipsoid dates to the 17th century, as described by Isaac Newton in Principia. In the early 19th century, the flattening of the earth ellipsoid was determined to be of the order of 1/300 (Delambre, Everest). The modern value as determined by the US DoD World Geodetic System since the 1960s is close to 1/298.25. The scientific study of the shape of the Earth is known as geodesy.

== Cause ==
Earth is massive enough that the pull of gravity maintains its roughly spherical shape. Most of its deviation from spherical stems from the centrifugal force caused by rotation around its north-south axis. This force deforms the sphere into an oblate ellipsoid.

=== Formation ===
The Solar System formed from a dust cloud that was at least partially the remnant of one or more supernovas that produced heavy elements by nucleosynthesis. Grains of matter accreted through electrostatic interaction. As they grew in mass, gravity took over in gathering yet more mass, releasing the potential energy of their collisions and in-falling as heat. The protoplanetary disk also had a greater proportion of radioactive elements than Earth today because, over time, those elements decayed. Their decay heated the early Earth even further, and continues to contribute to Earth's internal heat budget. The early Earth was thus mostly liquid.

A sphere is the only stable shape for a non-rotating, gravitationally self-attracting liquid. The outward acceleration caused by Earth's rotation is greater at the equator than at the poles (where is it zero), so the sphere gets deformed into an ellipsoid, which represents the shape having the lowest potential energy for a rotating, fluid body. This ellipsoid is slightly fatter around the equator than a perfect sphere would be. Earth's shape is also slightly lumpy because it is composed of different materials of different densities that exert slightly different amounts of gravitational force per volume.

=== Later shape changes and effects ===
Though the surface rocks of Earth have cooled enough to solidify, the outer core of the planet is still hot enough to remain liquid. Energy is still being released; volcanic and tectonic activity has pushed rocks into hills and mountains and blown them out of calderas. Meteors also cause impact craters and surrounding ridges. However, if the energy release from these processes halts, then they tend to erode away over time and return toward the lowest potential-energy curve of the ellipsoid. Weather powered by solar energy can also move water, rock, and soil to make Earth slightly out of round.

Earth undulates as the shape of its lowest potential energy changes daily due to the gravity of the Sun and Moon as they move around with respect to Earth. This is what causes tides in the oceans' water, which can flow freely along the changing potential.

== History of concept and measurement ==
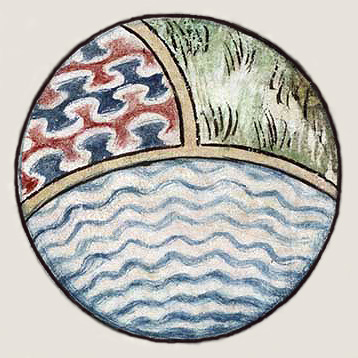
Medieval artistic representation of a spherical Earth – with compartments representing earth, air, and water (c. 1400)

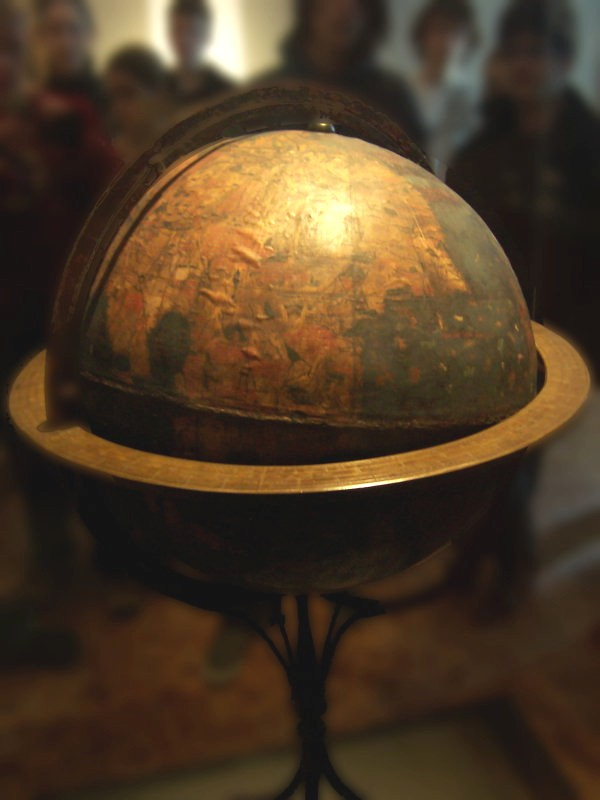
The Erdapfel, the oldest surviving terrestrial globe (1492/1493)

The spherical shape of the Earth was known and measured by astronomers, mathematicians, and navigators from a variety of literate ancient cultures, including the Hellenic World, and Ancient India. Greek ethnographer Megasthenes, c. 300 BC, has been interpreted as stating that the contemporary Brahmins of India believed in a spherical Earth as the center of the universe. The knowledge of the Greeks was inherited by Ancient Rome, and Christian and Islamic realms in the Middle Ages. Circumnavigation of the world in the Age of Discovery provided direct evidence. Improvements in transportation and other technologies refined estimations of the size of the Earth, and helped spread knowledge of it.

The earliest documented mention of the concept dates from around the 5th century BC, when it appears in the writings of Greek philosophers. In the 3rd century BC, Hellenistic astronomy established the roughly spherical shape of Earth as a physical fact and calculated the Earth's circumference. This knowledge was gradually adopted throughout the Old World during Late Antiquity and the Middle Ages. A practical demonstration of Earth's sphericity was achieved by Ferdinand Magellan and Juan Sebastián Elcano's circumnavigation (1519–1522).

The concept of a spherical Earth displaced earlier beliefs in a flat Earth: In early Mesopotamian mythology, the world was portrayed as a disk floating in the ocean with a hemispherical sky-dome above, and this forms the premise for early world maps like those of Anaximander and Hecataeus of Miletus. Other speculations on the shape of Earth include a seven-layered ziggurat or cosmic mountain, alluded to in the Avesta and ancient Persian writings (see seven climes).

The realization that the figure of the Earth is more accurately described as an ellipsoid dates to the 17th century, as described by Isaac Newton in Principia. In the early 19th century, the flattening of the Earth ellipsoid was determined to be of the order of 1/300 (Delambre, Everest). The modern value as determined by the US DoD World Geodetic System since the 1960s is close to 1/298.25.

== Measurement and representation ==
Geodesy, also called geodetics, is the scientific discipline that deals with the measurement and representation of Earth, its gravitational field and geodynamic phenomena (polar motion, Earth tides, and crustal motion) in three-dimensional time-varying space.

Geodesy is primarily concerned with positioning and the gravity field and geometrical aspects of their temporal variations, although it can also include the study of Earth's magnetic field. Especially in the German speaking world, geodesy is divided into geomensuration ("Erdmessung" or "höhere Geodäsie"), which is concerned with measuring Earth on a global scale, and surveying ("Ingenieurgeodäsie"), which is concerned with measuring parts of the surface.

Earth's shape can be thought of in at least two ways:

- as the shape of the geoid, the mean sea level of the world ocean; or
- as the shape of Earth's land surface as it rises above and falls below the sea.

As the science of geodesy measured Earth more accurately, the shape of the geoid was first found not to be a perfect sphere but to approximate an oblate spheroid, a specific type of ellipsoid. More recent measurements have measured the geoid to unprecedented accuracy, revealing mass concentrations beneath Earth's surface.

== Evidence ==
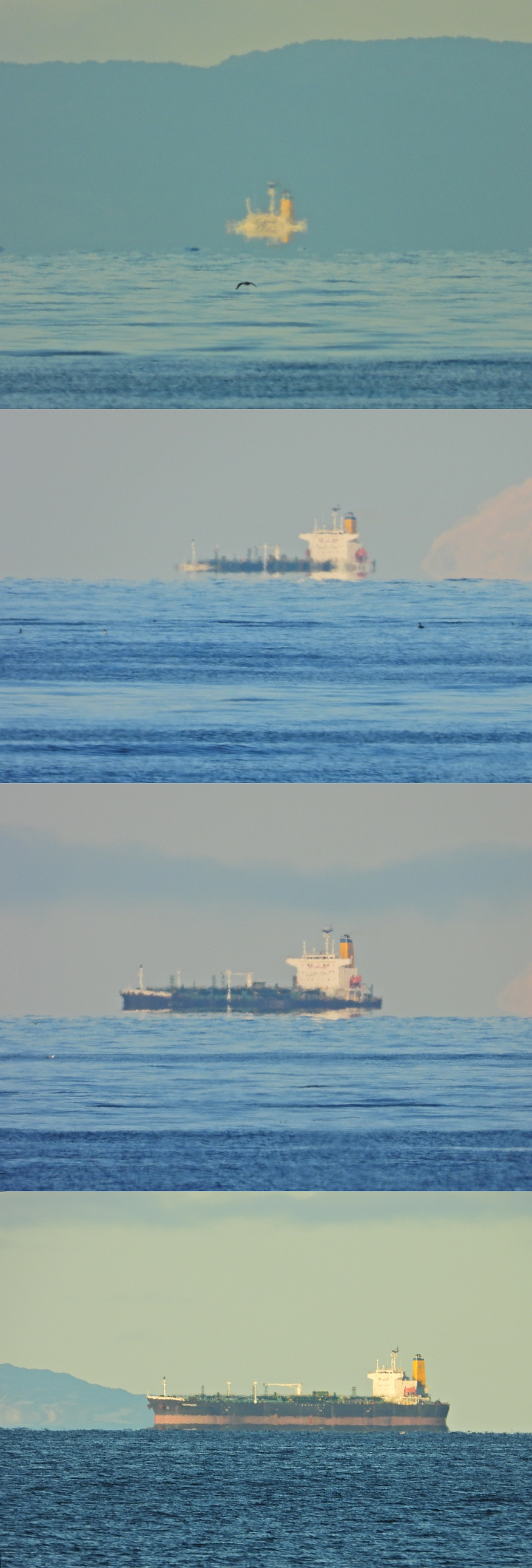
A sequence of pictures taken at Strait of Magellan, Chile, showing a tanker ship sailing towards the camera and rising over the horizon, demonstrating the Earth's curvature. Distance at first picture is about 18 km which would imply a theoretical horizon vertical drop of about 23 meters. Ship length is 186 m.

The roughly spherical shape of Earth can be empirically evidenced by many different types of observation, ranging from ground level, flight, or orbit. The spherical shape causes a number of effects and phenomena that when combined disprove flat Earth beliefs. These include the visibility of distant objects on Earth's surface; lunar eclipses; appearance of the Moon; observation of the sky from a certain altitude; observation of certain fixed stars from different locations; observing the Sun; surface navigation; grid distortion on a spherical surface; weather systems; gravity; and modern technology.

== See also ==
- Celestial sphere
- Celestial spheres
- Earth ellipsoid
- Earth radius
- Earth's rotation § Empirical tests
- Geodesy
- Geographical distance
- Myth of the flat Earth
- Physical geodesy
- Shapes of other astronomical bodies
- Terra Australis
- Timeline of Earth estimates
- WGS 84
