= Bessel ellipsoid =

Reference ellipsoid in geodesy

The Bessel ellipsoid (or Bessel 1841) is an important reference ellipsoid of geodesy. It is currently used by several countries for their national geodetic surveys, but will be replaced in the next decades by modern ellipsoids of satellite geodesy.

The Bessel ellipsoid was derived in 1841 by Friedrich Wilhelm Bessel, based on several arc measurements and other data of continental geodetic networks of Europe, Russia and the British Survey of India. It is based on 10 meridian arcs and 38 precise measurements of the astronomic latitude and longitude (see also astro geodesy). The dimensions of the Earth ellipsoid axes were defined by logarithms in keeping with former calculation methods.

== The Bessel and GPS ellipsoids ==
The Bessel ellipsoid fits especially well to the geoid curvature of Europe and Eurasia. Therefore, it is optimal for National survey networks in these regions, although its axes are about 700 m shorter than that of the mean Earth ellipsoid derived by satellites.

Below there are the two axes a, b and the flattening f = (a − b)/a. For comparison, the data of the modern World Geodetic System WGS84 are shown, which is mainly used for modern surveys and the GPS system.

- Bessel ellipsoid 1841 (defined by log a and f):
  - a = 6377397.155 m
  - f = 1 / 299.15281285
  - b = 6356078.962822 m.
- Earth ellipsoid WGS84 (defined directly by a and f):
  - a = 6378137.0 m
  - f = 1 / 298.257223563
  - b = 6356752.30 m.

== Usage ==
The ellipsoid data published by Bessel (1841) were then the best and most modern data mapping the Earth's figure. They were used by almost all national surveys. Some surveys in Asia switched to the Clarke ellipsoid of 1880. After the arrival of the geophysical reduction techniques many projects used other examples such as the Hayford ellipsoid of 1910 which was adopted in 1924 by the International Association of Geodesy (IAG) as the International ellipsoid 1924. All of them are influenced by geophysical effects like vertical deflection, mean continental density, rock density and the distribution of network data. Every reference ellipsoid deviates from the worldwide data (e.g. of satellite geodesy) in the same way as the pioneering work of Bessel.

In 1950 about 50% of the European triangulation networks and about 20% of other continents networks were based on the Bessel ellipsoid. In the following decades the American states switched mainly to the Hayford ellipsoid 1908 ("internat. Ell. 1924") which was also used for the European unification project ED50 sponsored by the United States after World War II. The Soviet Union forced its satellite states in Eastern Europe to use the Krasovsky ellipsoid of about 1940.

As of 2010 the Bessel ellipsoid is the geodetic system for Germany, for Austria and the Czech Republic. It is also used partly in the successor states of Yugoslavia and some Asian countries: Sumatra and Borneo, Belitung. In Africa it is the geodetic system for Eritrea and Namibia.

== See also ==
- Gauss–Krüger coordinate system – Adaptation of the standard Mercator projection
- Geodesy – Science of measuring the shape, orientation, and gravity of Earth
- Hayford ellipsoid – Earth-approximating ellipsoid introduced in 1910
- Helmert transformation – Transformation method within a three-dimensional space
- WGS 72 – Geodetic reference system
- WGS 84 – Geodetic reference system
