= Clairaut's theorem (gravity) =

Theorem about gravity

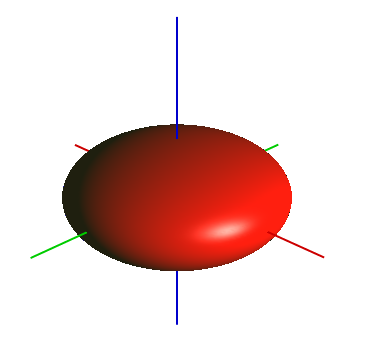
Figure 1: An ellipsoid

Figure 2: Wireframe rendering of an ellipsoid (oblate spheroid)

Clairaut's theorem characterizes the surface gravity on a viscous rotating ellipsoid in hydrostatic equilibrium under the action of its gravitational field and centrifugal force. It was published in 1743 by Alexis Claude Clairaut in a treatise which synthesized physical and geodetic evidence that the Earth is an oblate ellipsoid. It was initially used to relate the gravity at any point on the Earth's surface to the position of that point, allowing the ellipticity or the flattening of the Earth to be calculated from measurements of gravity at different latitudes. Today it has been largely supplanted by the Somigliana equation.

== History ==
Although it had been known since antiquity that the Earth was approximately spherical, by the 17th century evidence was accumulating that it was not a perfect sphere. In 1672 Jean Richer found the first evidence that gravity was not constant over the Earth (as it would be if the Earth were a sphere); he took a pendulum clock to Cayenne, French Guiana and found that it lost 2 1/2 minutes per day compared to its rate at Paris. This indicated the acceleration of gravity was less at Cayenne than at Paris. Pendulum gravimeters began to be taken on voyages to remote parts of the world, and it was slowly discovered that gravity increases smoothly with increasing latitude, gravitational acceleration being about 0.5% greater at the poles than at the equator.

British physicist Isaac Newton explained this in his Principia Mathematica (1687) in which he outlined his theory and calculations on the shape of the Earth. Newton theorized correctly that the Earth was not precisely a sphere but had an oblate ellipsoidal shape, slightly flattened at the poles due to the centrifugal force of its rotation. Using geometric calculations, he gave a concrete argument as to the hypothetical ellipsoid shape of the Earth.

The goal of Principia was not to provide exact answers for natural phenomena, but to theorize potential solutions to these unresolved factors in science. Newton pushed for scientists to look further into the unexplained variables. Two prominent researchers that he inspired were Alexis Clairaut and Pierre Louis Maupertuis. They both sought to prove the validity of Newton's theory on the shape of the Earth. In order to do so, they went on an expedition to Lapland in an attempt to accurately measure a meridian arc. From such measurements they could calculate the eccentricity of the Earth, its degree of departure from a perfect sphere.

Clairaut confirmed that Newton's theory that the Earth was ellipsoidal was correct, but that his calculations were in error, and he wrote a letter to the Royal Society of London with his findings. The society published an article in Philosophical Transactions the following year, 1737. In it Clairaut pointed out (Section XVIII) that Newton's Proposition XX of Book 3 does not apply to the real earth. It stated that the weight of an object at some point in the earth depended only on the proportion of its distance from the centre of the earth to the distance from the centre to the surface at or above the object, so that the total weight of a column of water at the centre of the earth would be the same no matter in which direction the column went up to the surface. Newton had in fact said that this was on the assumption that the matter inside the earth was of a uniform density (in Proposition XIX). Newton realized that the density was probably not uniform, and proposed this as an explanation for why gravity measurements found a greater difference between polar regions and equatorial regions than what his theory predicted. However, he also thought this would mean the equator was further from the centre than what his theory predicted, and Clairaut points out that the opposite is true. Clairaut points out at the beginning of his article that Newton did not explain why he thought the earth was ellipsoid rather than like some other oval, but that Clairaut, and James Stirling almost simultaneously, had shown why the earth should be an ellipsoid in 1736.

Clairaut's article did not provide a valid equation to back up his argument as well. This created much controversy in the scientific community. It was not until Clairaut wrote Théorie de la figure de la terre in 1743 that a proper answer was provided. In it, he promulgated what is more formally known today as Clairaut's theorem.

== Formula ==
Clairaut's theorem says that the acceleration due to gravity g (including the effect of centrifugal force) on the surface of a spheroid in hydrostatic equilibrium (being a fluid or having been a fluid in the past, or having a surface near sea level) at latitude φ is:

$$g(\varphi) = G_e \left[ 1 + \left(\frac{5}{2} m - f\right) \sin^2 \varphi \right] \, ,$$
where

- $G_e$ is the value of the acceleration of gravity at the equator,
- $m$ the ratio of the centrifugal force to gravity $\omega^2R_E(\phi=0)/g(\phi=0)$ at the equator, and
- $f$ the flattening of a meridian section of the earth, defined as:

$$f = \frac {a-b}{a} \, ,$$
(where a = semi-major axis, b = semi-minor axis).

The contribution of the centrifugal force is approximately $-G_e m\cos^2\varphi,$ whereas gravitational attraction itself varies approximately as $G_e\left(\frac32 m-f\right)\sin^2\varphi.$ This formula holds when the surface is perpendicular to the direction of gravity (including centrifugal force), even if (as usually) the density is not constant. (In which case the gravitational attraction can be calculated at any point from the shape alone, without reference to $m$.) For the earth, $m\approx 1/289,$ and $\frac52 m\approx 1/116,$ while $f\approx 1/300,$ so $g$ is greater at the poles (5.3‰, 0.43% Newton) than on the equator.

Clairaut derived the formula under the assumption that the body was composed of concentric coaxial spheroidal layers of constant density. This work was subsequently pursued by Laplace, who assumed surfaces of equal density which were nearly spherical. The English mathematician George Stokes showed in 1849 that the theorem applied to any law of density so long as the external surface is a spheroid of equilibrium. A history of more recent developments and more detailed equations for g can be found in Khan.

The above expression for g has been supplanted by the Somigliana equation (after Carlo Somigliana).

== Geodesy ==
The spheroidal shape of the Earth is the result of the interplay between gravity and centrifugal force caused by the Earth's rotation about its axis. In his Principia, Newton proposed the equilibrium shape of a homogeneous rotating Earth is a rotational ellipsoid with a flattening f given by 1/230. As a result, gravity increases from the equator to the poles. By applying Clairaut's theorem, Laplace found from 15 gravity values that f = 1/330: g_{NP}/G_{eq} − 1 = 5.6‰. A modern estimate is 1:298.25642. See Figure of the Earth for more detail.

For a detailed account of the construction of the reference Earth model of geodesy, see Chatfield.
