= UGC 12840 =

Lenticular galaxy in the constellation Pegasus

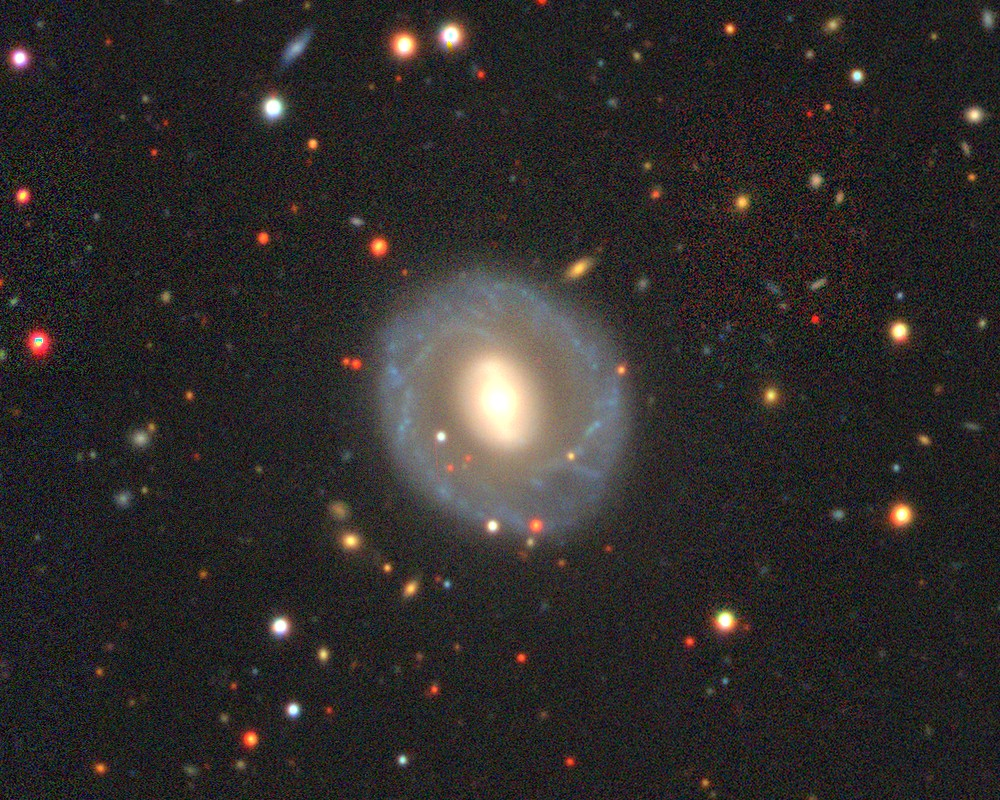
- UGC 12840 imaged by Legacy Survey

Observation data (J2000 epoch)
- Constellation: Pegasus
- Right ascension: 23^{h} 54^{m} 29.94^{s}
- Declination: +28° 52′ 17.55″
- Redshift: 0.022877
- Heliocentric radial velocity: 6,858 ± 3 km/s
- Distance: 342.9 ± 24.0 Mly (105.12 ± 7.36 Mpc)
- magnitude (J): 11.58
- magnitude (K): 12.06

Characteristics
- Type: (R)SAB(s)0^0^
- Size: ~119,000 ly (36.5 kpc) (estimated)

Other designations
- CGCG 498-032, 2MASX J23542990+2852173, PGC 72829, KIG 1044, LDCE 1601 NED005, MCG +05-01-002, NSA 152890, UZC J235430.0+285217

UGC 12840 is a lenticular galaxy located in the constellation of Pegasus. The redshift of this galaxy is estimated to be (z) 0.022 and it was first discovered by astronomers in September 1982 where they found it in the Pegasus Supercluster. It is also categorized as an isolated galaxy.

== Description ==
UGC 12840 is a gas-rich face-on lenticular galaxy with an SB0 morphology. The appearance of the galaxy looks almost round but the rotation velocity has a large projection of 100 kilometers per seconds. There is also an outer H II ring structure with a diameter of 11.4 kiloparsecs, with further evidence of a nuclear emission line source described as bright. The far-infrared emission of the galaxy has been estimated as 0.40 jansky at 100 micrometer (ɥm) detections.

A study published in December 2003, has found UGC 12840 is a late-type galaxy. The total molecular gas mass has been estimated to be 8.25 M_{☉} based on its carbon oxide (CO) line intensity with the heliocentric velocity of the lines calculated as 6,850 kilometers per seconds. The center of the galaxy possibly displays noncircular gas motions. A giant ring is also detected in addition with a measured total radius of 12.5 kiloparsecs and has hydrogen-alpha emission.
