= Irene Fischer =

Austrian-American mathematician and geodesist

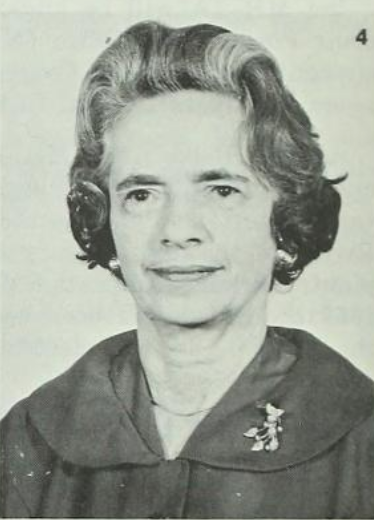
- Irene K. Fischer, from a 1966 publication of the United States Army
- Born: Irene Kaminka Fischer; July 27, 1907; Vienna, Austria
- Died: October 22, 2009 (aged 102); Boston, Massachusetts, U.S.
- Spouse: Eric Erich Fischer
- Children: 2
- Scientific career
- Fields: Geodesy; Mathematics

Irene Kaminka Fischer (born July 27, 1907, in Vienna, Austria, died October 22, 2009, in Boston) was an Austrian-American mathematician and geodesist. She was a member of the National Academy of Engineering, a Fellow of the American Geophysical Union, and inductee of the National Imagery and Mapping Agency Hall of Fame. Fischer became one of two internationally known women scientists in the field of geodesy during the golden age of the Project Mercury and the Apollo program. Her Mercury datum (or Fischer ellipsoid 1960 and 1968), as well as her work on the lunar parallax, were instrumental in conducting these missions. "In his preface to the ACSM publication, Fischer's former colleague, Bernard Chovitz, referred to her as one of the most renowned geodesists of the third quarter of the twentieth century. Yet this fact alone makes her one of the most renowned geodesists of all times, because, according to Chovitz, the third quarter of the twentieth century witnessed "the transition of geodesy from a regional to a global enterprise."

== Early life and education ==
Born and educated in Vienna, she studied descriptive and projective geometry at the Technical University of Vienna and mathematics at the University of Vienna. Her teachers Moritz Schlick and Hans Hahn were among the luminaries of the Vienna Circle; and her fellow students included physicist Victor Weisskopf, sociologist Paul Lazarsfeld, and social psychologist Marie Jahoda. Her father, Rabbi Armand Aharon Kaminka, was head of the Maimonides Institute, and regularly led high holiday services at the famed Vienna Musikverein. He worked for the Alliance Israélite Universelle investigating pogroms in Eastern Europe and raised money in the U.S. and Western Europe to help victims.

In 1931 she married historian and geographer Eric Fischer, who helped introduce American, as distinct from British, history to Vienna. The Fischer family established and ran the 1843-founded Vienna Israelitische Kinderbewahranstalt, the first professional kindergarten and kindergarten teacher training school in Vienna, a place that also became a refuge for immigrants to Vienna from Eastern Europe.

== Career ==
In 1939, the Fischers, with their young daughter, Gay, fled Nazi Austria, traveling by rail to Italy, by boat to Palestine and in 1941 by boat around East Africa and the Cape of Good Hope to Boston, where they lived with Eric Fischer's sister, mother, and brother in law, the physician Otto Ehrentheil and their two daughters. Looking for jobs, Fischer first worked as a seamstress’ assistant, then she graded blue books for Wassily Leontief at Harvard and for Norbert Wiener at the Massachusetts Institute of Technology (MIT). She also worked on stereoscopic projective geometry trajectories for John Rule at MIT. She taught mathematics at Brown and Nichols Preparatory School in Cambridge, and then at Sidwell Friends in Washington, D.C.

After World War II, and after her son, Michael, born in 1946, had reached school age, she found a job at the then Army Map Service, now the National Geospatial-Intelligence Agency and the Army Geospatial Center in Potomac, Md., working under John A. O'Keefe in the Geodesy Branch and rising through the ranks to become the chief. Her twenty-five-year career at AMS, working on what became the World Geodetic System, produced over 120 scientific publications. On the side, she published a high school geometry textbook in 1965, one of her many endeavors as an educator. After retiring in 1975, she wrote a memoir of her scientific career that was first serialized in the ACSM Bulletin covering the field of geodesy in the years 1951–1975, and discussing doing science in a man's world in a government bureaucracy. It was published as a book in 2005.

At the very beginning of her career in mathematics and geodesy, Dr. Fischer had quickly taught herself the basics of geodetic tables, datums, transformations, gravity studies, astronomy, long lines, flare triangulation, and guided missile ballistics. Her updates to geodetic science helped determine the parallax of the Moon. Irene Fischer was also intrigued by research into post glacial uplift, and her geoid studies went hand in hand with investigations of the lingering effects of the last ice age.

Fischer disagreed with the established figure for the oblateness of the Earth (the fraction by which the polar axis is foreshortened by the equatorial radius), which had remained unchallenged since 1924. She was forbidden to use her updated figures in her own work because that result was in disagreement with the accepted literature. However, after the flight of the first satellites, she was vindicated by the data and observations from the instruments, and she was allowed to amend her previous works with her newly derived figures. In commenting on the lack of faith others put on her research, Dr. Fischer goodheartedly quipped that the satellites had not accepted the accepted literature, either.

== Legacy ==
A pioneer during a time when there were few women in surveying, in 1967, Fischer was the first Army Map Service employee, and only the third woman ever, to receive the Distinguished Civilian Service Award. Fischer was internationally known for her many publications and presentations on the size and shape of the earth, including the Department of Defense manual, “Latitude Functions Fischer 1960 Ellipsoid.”

Fischer wrote an autobiography (published 2005), entitled, Geodesy? What’s That? My Personal Involvement in the Age-Old Quest for the Size and Shape of the Earth, With a Running Commentary on Life in a Government Research Office. In addition, Fischer has written more than 120 other technical reports, articles and books in her fields of expertise, and many of her significant government reports are still classified today.

Winner of many federal government service awards, Fischer was awarded an honorary degree by the University of Karlsruhe, elected to the National Academy of Engineering, elected Fellow of the American Geophysical Union, and inducted into the National Imagery and Mapping Agency (NIMA) Hall of Fame; the Learning Center at the new campus of the National Geospatial-Intelligence Agency has been named in her honor.

== Publications ==
- Fischer, Irene. 2006. "Racing Against Time." American Congress on Surveying and Mapping Bulletin. Volume 220, pages 38–48.
- Fischer, Irene K. 2006. "Catch 22 and a String of Kudos" [Falls Church, Va.]: American Congress on Surveying and Mapping, Edition/Format: Article. Publication: ACSM bulletin. no. 221, (2006): 22.
- Fischer, Irene K. 2005. Geodesy? what's that?: my personal involvement in the age-old quest for the size and shape of the earth with a running commentary on life in a government research office. New York, N.Y.: IUniverse, Inc. ISBN 0-595-36399-7.
- Fischer, Irene. 1998. "Earth, Size of." In Good, G.S., ed. Sciences of the Earth: Encyclopedia of Events, People and Phenomena. Garland Publishing: New York. ISBN 081530062X.
- Fischer, Irene. 1979. "The Effect of the Mid‐Atlantic Ridge in Terms of Gravity Anomalies, Geoidal Undulations, and Deflections of the Vertical". Marine Geodesy. 2, no. 3: 215–237.
- Fischer, Irene. 1977. "Mean Sea Level and the Marine Geoid—an Analysis of Concepts". Marine Geodesy. 1, no. 1: 37–59.
- Fischer, Irene. 1977. "Does mean sea level slope up or down toward north?" Curitiba: Universidade Federal do Paraná, Curso de Pós-Graduação em Ciências Geodésicas, 1977. Series: Boletim da Universidade Federal do Paraná; Geodésia (Curitiba, Brazil), no. 20.
- Fischer, Irene. 1975. "The Figure of the Earth? Changes in Concepts". Geophysical Surveys. 2, no. 1: pages 3–54.
- Fischer, Irene. 1974. "Deflections at Sea". Journal of Geophysical Research. 79, no. 14: pages 2123–2128.
- Fischer, Irene. Deflections at Sea: Presented to the International Symposium on the Earth's Gravitational Field and Secular Variations in Position, Sydney ... 1973. Washington: Defense Mapping Agency, Topographic Center, 1973.
- Fischer, Irene. The Geoid in South America Refered [sic] to Various Reference Systems. Buenos Aires: Instituto Panamericano de Geografia e Historia, 1970. Paper Presented to the Xth Pan American Consultation on Cartography, Guatemala City 1965. Washington: Pan American Institute of Geography and History, 1969.
- Fischer, Irene. The Development of the South American Datum 1969 (70-290). 1970. Papers from the 30th annual meeting [of the] American congress on surveying and mapping, ...1970.
- United States, and Irene Fischer. New Pieces in the Picture Puzzle of an Astrogeodetic Geoid Map of the World. Washington, D.C.: U.S. Dept. of the Army, Corps of Engineers, Topographic Command, 1969.
- Fischer, Irene. 1968. GEOID DETERMINATIONS. ARMY MAP SERVICE WASHINGTON DC. Publisher: Ft. Belvoir Defense Technical Information Center JAN 1968. Edition/Format: Book : English
- Fischer, Irene. 1967. "Geoid charts of North and Central America." United States. Army Map Service.; et al. Washington, 1967. Series: United States.; Army Map Service.; Technical report. Abstract: The North American geoid map constructed by the Army Map Service in 1957 has been revised to accommodate accumulated new data. The procedure for constructing these three maps and the differences between them are explained.
- Fischer, Irene. 1966. "A Revision of the GEOID Map of North America." Journal of Geophysical Research (JGR). Volume 71, number 20, pages 4905–4908.
- Fischer, Irene, and Dunstan Hayden. 1965. Geometry. Boston: Allyn and Bacon. And: Geometry. Teachers' supplement. and Geometry. Answer book. Allyn and Bacon. For Grades 9–12. by Irene Fischer and Dunstan Hayden.
- Fischer, Irene and Mary Slutsky. 1964. "Conversion graphs for an astrogeodetic world datum." United States. Army Map Service. Washington: Corps of Engineers, U.S. Army, Army Map Service, 1964. Series: United States.; Army Map Service.; Technical report. Cover title. Folded maps in pocket downgraded from confidential 11–5–65. Description: 17 pages: 3 fold. maps; 27 cm.
- Wilson, Donna. 1963. "Notes of Working Symposium on Solar System Constants, Feb 22-26, 1962." Rand Corporation, Santa Monica, CA. May 1963. 79 pages. Dr. Fischer added comments and notes.
- Fischer, Irene. 1963. "The distance to the moon." Philosophical Society of Washington (Washington, D.C.). Published by the co-operation of the Smithsonian Institution, 1963. Series: Bulletin of the Philosophical Society of Washington, Vol. 16, no. 2.
- Fischer, Irene. 1962. THE PARALLAX OF THE MOON IN TERMS OF A WORLD GEODETIC SYSTEM. ARMY MAP SERVICE WASHINGTON D C. Publisher: Ft. Belvoir Defense Technical Information Center AUG 1962. DTIC Report Number: ADAAD0602535. Contents: The transit observations of mosting A, The geodetically computed distance between the observatories, Hansen's value of mean parallax, The geometric parallax as referred to the astrogeodetic world datum, The dynamical parallax, The lunar distance from occultations, The lunar distance from radar measurements.
- Kaula, W. M. and Irene Fischer. 1959. US Army World Geodetic System 1959, Part I, Methods. Army Map Service Technical Reports 27. November 1959.
- Fischer, Irene. 1959. "A Tentative World Datum from Geoidal Heights Based on the Hough Ellipsoid and the Columbus Geoid". Journal of Geophysical Research. 64 (1): 73–84.

== See also ==
- Gladys West
