= Airy spheroid =

The Airy spheroid or Airy ellipsoid is a mathematical model of the Earth, an Earth ellipsoid, designed to fit the well for the British Isles. It is named after its inventor George Biddell Airy, a nineteenth century English mathematician.

== Airy 1830 ellipsoid ==
The Airy 1830 ellipsoid has an equatorial radius of 6,377,563.396 m, a polar radius of 6,356,256.909 m and an inverse flattening of 299.3249646.

The original definition was in feet – using the 1796 definition of the foot, an equatorial radius of 20,923,713 ft and a polar radius of 20,853,810 ft. When the Ordnance Survey retriangulated in 1936 they defined a conversion to metres, namely a ratio of (10^{0.48401603})/10 which is approximately 1 ft = 0.3048007491 m.

== Airy Modified 1849 ==
The 1849 ellipsoid (EPSG:7002), known as Airy Modified 1849, is the 1830 ellipsoid scaled by 0.999965 to better fit the primary triangulation of Ireland.

== See also ==
- Irish grid reference system
- Ordnance Survey National Grid
