= Concentricity error =

Measure characterizing an optical fiber

The concentricity error of an optical fiber is the distance between the center of the two concentric circles that specify the cladding diameter and the center of the two concentric circles that specify the core diameter.

The concentricity error is used in conjunction with tolerance fields to specify or characterize optical fiber core and cladding geometry.

== See also ==
- Ovality
- Centration (engineering)
