= Hayford ellipsoid =

Earth-approximating ellipsoid introduced in 1910

In geodesy, the Hayford ellipsoid is a reference ellipsoid named after the American geodesist John Fillmore Hayford (1868–1925), which was introduced in 1910. The Hayford ellipsoid was also referred to as the International ellipsoid 1924 after it had been adopted by the International Union of Geodesy and Geophysics IUGG in 1924, and was recommended for use all over the world. Many countries retained their previous ellipsoids.

The Hayford ellipsoid is defined by its semi-major axis a = 6378388.000 m and its flattening f = 1:297.00. Unlike some of its predecessors, such as the Bessel ellipsoid (a = 6377397 m, f = 1:299.15), which was a European ellipsoid, the Hayford ellipsoid also included measurements from North America, as well as other continents (to a lesser extent). It also included isostatic measurements to reduce plumbline divergences. Hayfords ellipsoid did not reach the accuracy of Helmert's ellipsoid published 1906 (a = 6378200 m, f = 1:298.3).

It has since been replaced as the "International ellipsoid" by the newer Lucerne ellipsoid (1967) and GRS 80 (1980).

== See also ==
- Earth ellipsoid

== Sources ==
- Defense Mapping Agency: Geodesy for the layman, 1983, p. 8
