= South American Datum =

The South American Datum (SAD) is a regional historical geodetic datum for South America. The most common version was established in 1969 (SAD69), as adopted by the Pan American Institute of Geography and History.

It uses as reference ellipsoid the Geodetic Reference System 1967 (GRS-67), recommended by the International Union of Geodesy and Geophysics in Lucerne in 1967. This ellipsoid acquired topocentric orientation defined at the astrogeodetic vertex Chuá, in the municipality of Uberaba, Brazil.

This datum was subsequently adopted by many South American countries, including the earlier Brazilian Geodetic System (Sistema Geodésico Brasileiro - SGB). In most countries, SAD was recently replaced by SIRGAS; for example, in Brazil SIRGAS was adopted starting in 2005 and mandated since 2014.
