= Jean Richer =

French astronomer

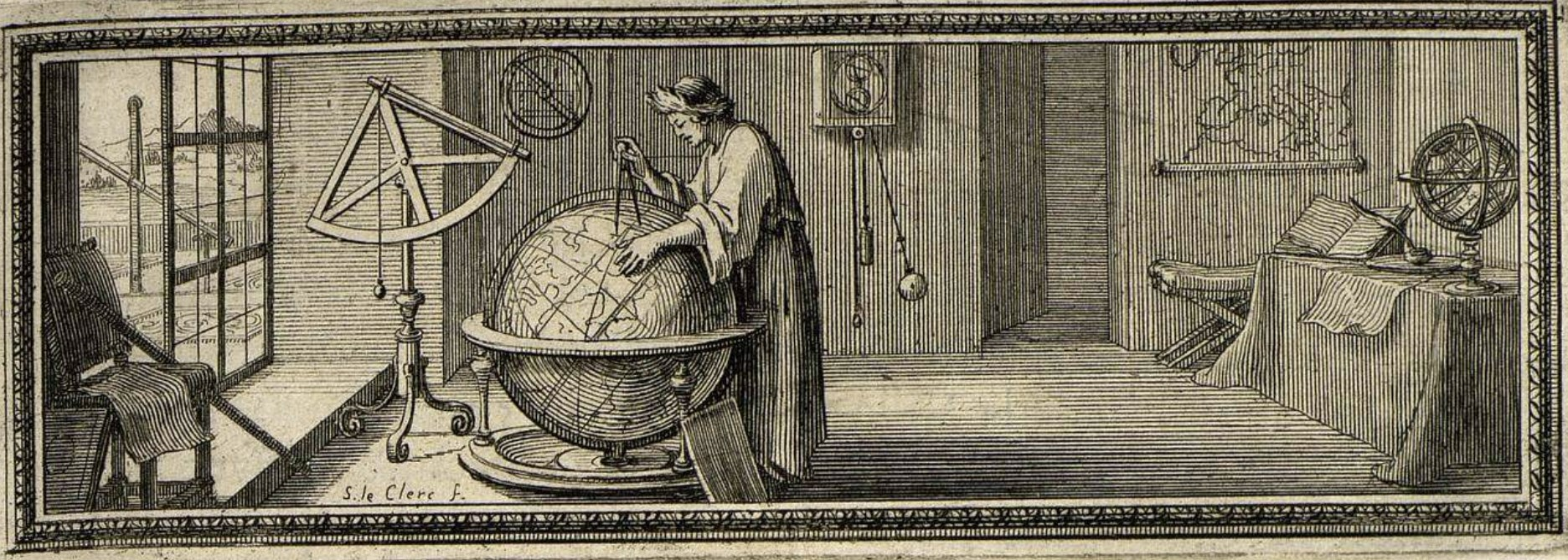
Astronomical and gravimetric observations made on the island of Cayenne by Jean Richer, after an engraving by Sébastien Leclerc.

Jean Richer (1630–1696) was a French astronomer and assistant (élève astronome) at the French Academy of Sciences, under the direction of Giovanni Domenico Cassini.

Between 1671 and 1673 he performed experiments and carried out celestial observations in Cayenne, French Guiana, at the request of the French Academy. His observations and measurements of Mars during its perihelic opposition, coupled with those made simultaneously in Paris by Cassini, led to the earliest data-based estimate of the distance between Earth and Mars, which they then used to calculate the distance between the Sun and Earth (the astronomical unit).

While there he also measured the length of a seconds pendulum, that is a pendulum with a half-swing of one second, and found it to be 1.25 lignes (2.256 millimeters) shorter than at Paris. His method was to compare the oscillation of a freely decaying pendulum with the time kept by another mechanical clock and astronomical observations. (Note: To obtain the relative difference in the pendulum's frequency from this number, note that Richer gives the Paris pendulum's length as 3 feet 8+1/3 lignes, equaling 1321/3 lignes (993.3 mm). The 1.25 ligne discrepancy is a 0.28% difference in length, and thus a 0.14% difference in frequency. Since the seconds pendulum length is proportional to the local gravity, Richer's result means that the local gravity in is weaker by 0.28% of gravity, or about $0.028 \mathrm{ m/s}^2$.) Richer was the first person to observe a change in gravitational force over the surface of the Earth, perhaps beginning the science of gravimetry.

Isaac Newton later commented that if, as he had proposed, the force of gravity decreases with the inverse square of the distance between objects, the obvious conclusion to be drawn from Richer's work is that near-equatorial Cayenne is further from the centre of the Earth than Paris, where the first such measurements had been taken. Thus the Earth could not be spherical, as had earlier been presumed, but rather bulges at and near the equator (equatorial bulge). Newton's claim of a 2.5 minutes per day difference translates to a 0.17% difference in frequency, in fair agreement with Richer's measurement.

While Newton interpreted it as due to oblateness of Earth, Christiaan Huygens interpreted it instead as due to the centrifugal force which reduces the apparent gravity at the equator. Assuming the actual gravity is a constant $g$ across the surface of Earth, and the Earth is a perfect sphere of radius $R$ and angular velocity $\Omega$, then the apparent gravity at latitude $\phi$ is $g - \Omega^2 R \cos^3(\phi)$. Paris is at latitude 49°, and Cayenne is at latitude 5°, which gives the difference in apparent gravity as $0.024 \mathrm{ m/s}^2$.

Richer's 1673 return to Paris was duly celebrated, and when his data were reproduced, the findings for which we remember him could be made public. However, publication was delayed, for unknown causes, until 1679, when a work entitled Observations Astronomiques et Physiques Faites en L'Isle de Caïenne par M. Richer, de l'Académie Royale des Sciences, was released under Richer's name. Not long thereafter, he was assigned to an engineering project in Germany. The remainder of his life is undocumented. Most biographers believe that he died at Paris in 1696.

== See also ==
- Seconds pendulum
