= Ovality =

In telecommunications and fiber optics, ovality or noncircularity is the degree of deviation from perfect circularity of the cross section of the core or cladding of the fiber.

The cross-sections of the core and cladding are assumed to a first approximation to be elliptical, and ovality is defined to be twice the third flattening of the ellipse, $2\frac{a-b} {a+b}$, where a is the length of the major axis and b is the length of the minor axis. This dimensionless quantity is between 0 and 1, and may be multiplied by 100 to express ovality as a percentage. Alternatively, ovality of the core or cladding may be specified by a tolerance field consisting of two concentric circles, within which the cross section boundaries must lie.

In measurements, ovality is the amount of out-of-roundness of a hole or cylindrical part in the typical form of an oval.

== In chemistry ==
In computational chemistry, especially in QSAR studies, ovality refers to, a measure of how the shape of a molecule approaches a sphere (at one extreme) or a cigar shape (at the other). Ovality is described by a ratio of volume to area:

$O = \frac {A}{4\pi(\frac{3V}{4\pi})^{\frac 2 3}}$

where:

O = Ovality
A = Area
V = Volume

The ovality of the He atom is 1.0 and that of HC_{24}H (12 triple bonds) is ~1.7.

== See also ==
- Concentricity error
- Roundness (object)
