= Jean Picard =

French astronomer and priest (1620–1682)

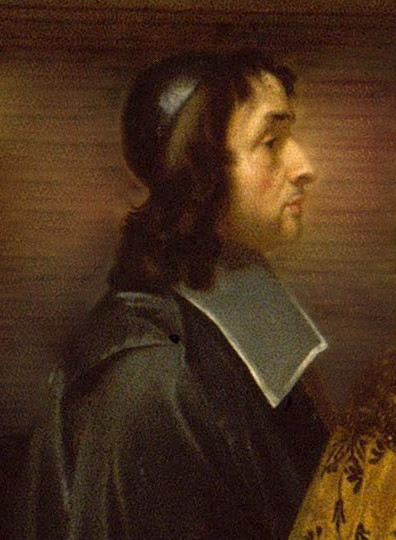
- Picard by Henri Testelin, c. 1680
- Born: 21 July 1620; La Flèche, Kingdom of France
- Died: 12 July 1682 (aged 61); Paris, Kingdom of France
- Occupations: Astronomer, priest

Jean Picard (French pronunciation: [ʒɑ̃ pikaʁ]; 21 July 1620 – 12 July 1682) was a French priest, astronomer and pioneer in geodesy, born in La Flèche, where he studied at the Collège royal Henri le Grand. He is best known for accurately measuring the size of the Earth, through a survey of one degree of latitude along the Paris Meridian.

== Geodesy ==
Picard was the first to measure the size of the Earth with notable accuracy in a 1669–1670 arc measurement survey, for which he is commemorated by a pyramid at Juvisy-sur-Orge. Guided by Maurolycus's methodology and Willebrord Snellius's mathematics approach, he measured one degree of latitude along the Paris Meridian using triangulation across thirteen points from Paris to Sourdon, near Amiens.

His calculations showed 110.46 km (68.64 mi) per degree of latitude, implying a radius of 6,328.9 km (3,932.6 mi). a figure later used by Isaac Newton in developing his theory of universal gravitation.

Modern measurements put the polar radius about 6,357 km (3,950 mi), meaning Picard's result was only 0.44% lower than today's accepted value. A testament to how improved instruments advanced astronomy and cartography alike.

== Instruments ==
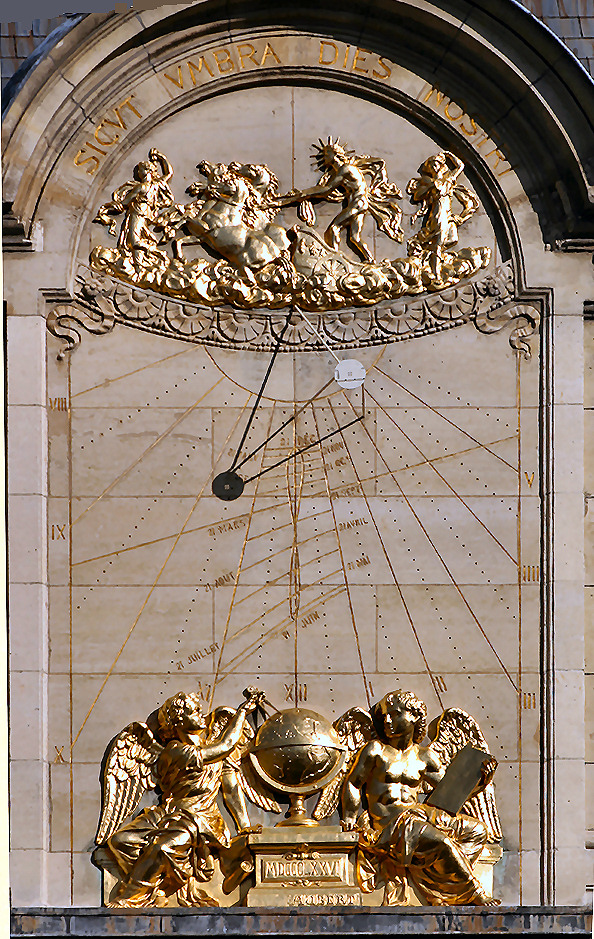
Jean Picard sundial on the pediment of the Sorbonne

Picard was the first to attach a telescope with crosswires (developed by William Gascoigne) to a quadrant, and one of the first to use a micrometer screw on his instruments. The quadrant he used to determine the size of the Earth had a radius of 38 inches (96.5 cm) and was graduated to quarter-minutes. The sextant he used to find the meridian had a radius of six feet (1.8 m) and had a micrometer to enable minute adjustments. These equipment improvements made the margin of error only ten seconds, as opposed to Tycho Brahe's four minutes of error. This made his measurements 24 times as accurate.

== Other work ==
In 1670–71, Picard travelled to the site of Tycho Brahe's Danish observatory, Uraniborg, in order to assess its longitude accurately so that Tycho's readings could be compared to others.

Picard collaborated and corresponded with many scientists, including Isaac Newton, Christiaan Huygens, Ole Rømer, Rasmus Bartholin, Johann Hudde, and even his main competitor, Giovanni Cassini, although Cassini was often less than willing to return the gesture. These correspondences led to Picard's contributions to areas of science outside the field of geodesy, such as the aberration of light he observed while he was in Uraniborg, or his discovery of mercurial phosphorescence upon his observance of the faint glowing of a barometer. This discovery led to Newton's studies of light's visible spectrum.

Picard also developed what became the standard method for measuring the right ascension of a celestial object. In this method, the observer records the time at which the object crosses the observer's meridian. Picard made his observations using the precision pendulum clock that Dutch physicist Christiaan Huygens had recently developed.

== Legacy ==
- There is a lunar crater named after Picard, on the southwest quadrant of Mare Crisium.
- The PICARD mission, an orbiting solar observatory, is named after Picard.

== Works ==
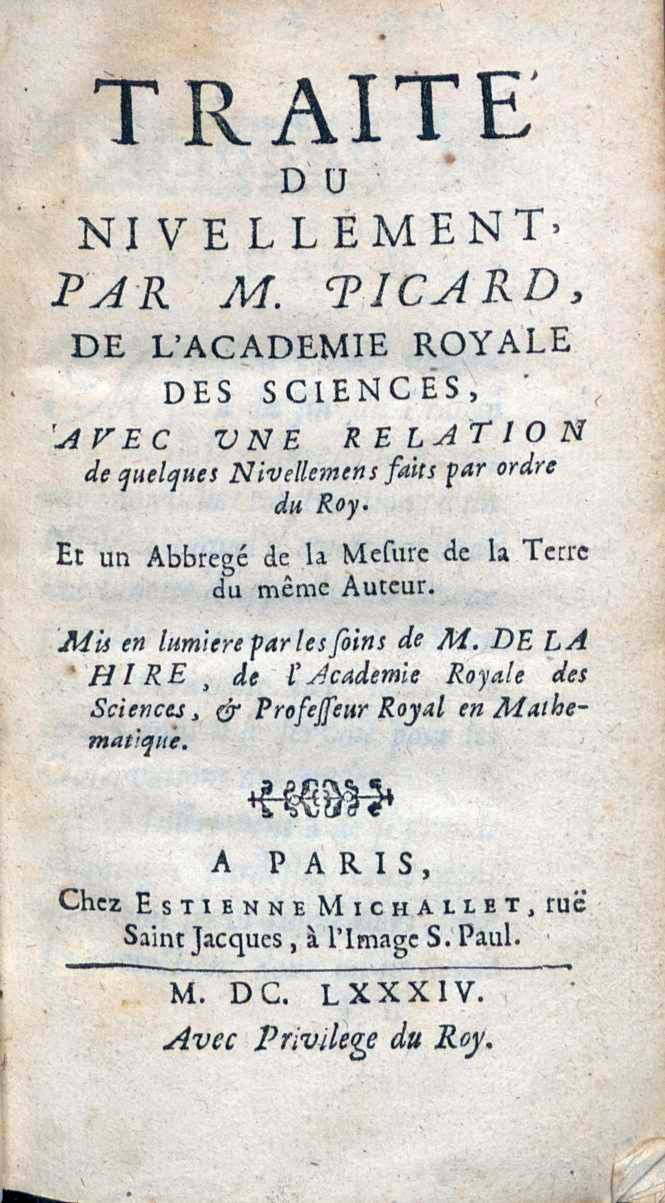
Traité du nivellement, 1684

- Mesure de la Terre (1671).
- Voyage d'Uranibourg (in French). Paris: Imprimerie nationale. 1680.
- Traité du nivellement (in French). Paris: Estienne Michallet. 1684.

== See also ==
- List of Roman Catholic scientist-clerics
- Meridian arc
- Seconds pendulum
