= Earth ellipsoid =

Geometric figure which approximates the Earth's shape

A scale diagram of the oblateness of the 2003 IERS reference ellipsoid. Ellipse with the same eccentricity as that of Earth, with north at the top Circle with diameter equal to the ellipse's minor axis Kármán line, 100 km (62 mi) above sea level Altitude range of the ISS in low Earth orbit

An Earth ellipsoid or Earth spheroid is a mathematical figure approximating the Earth's shape and size, used as part of a reference frame for coordinates and computations in geodesy, astronomy, and the geosciences. Various different reference ellipsoids have been used as approximations.

It is an oblate spheroid (an ellipsoid of revolution) whose minor axis (polar diameter), connecting the geographical poles, is approximately aligned with the Earth's axis of rotation. The ellipsoid is also defined by the major axis (equatorial axis); the difference between the two axes is slightly more than 21 km or 0.335%.

Many methods exist for determination of the axes of an Earth ellipsoid, ranging from meridian arcs up to modern satellite geodesy or the analysis and interconnection of continental geodetic networks. Amongst the different set of data used in national surveys are several of special importance: the Bessel ellipsoid of 1841, the international Hayford ellipsoid of 1924, and (for GPS positioning) the WGS84 ellipsoid.

== Types ==
There are two types of ellipsoid: mean and reference.

A data set which describes the global average of the Earth's surface curvature is called the mean Earth ellipsoid. It refers to a theoretical coherence between the geographic latitude and the meridional curvature of the geoid. The latter is close to the mean sea level, and therefore an ideal Earth ellipsoid has the same volume as the geoid.

While the mean Earth ellipsoid is the ideal basis of global geodesy, for regional networks a so-called reference ellipsoid may be the better choice. When geodetic measurements have to be computed on a mathematical reference surface, this surface should have a similar curvature as the regional geoid; otherwise, reduction of the measurements will get small distortions.

This is the reason for the "long life" of former reference ellipsoids like the Hayford or the Bessel ellipsoid, despite the fact that their main axes deviate by several hundred meters from the modern values. Another reason is a judicial one: the coordinates of millions of boundary stones should remain fixed for a long period. If their reference surface changes, the coordinates themselves also change.

However, for international networks, GPS positioning, or astronautics, these regional reasons are less relevant. As knowledge of the Earth's figure is increasingly accurate, the International Geoscientific Union IUGG usually adapts the axes of the Earth ellipsoid to the best available data.

=== Reference ellipsoid ===
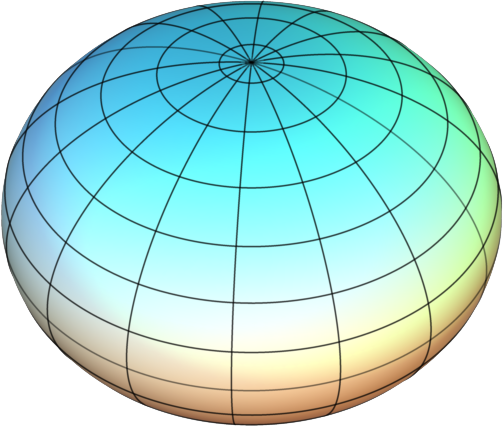
Flattened sphere

In geodesy, a reference ellipsoid is a mathematically defined surface that approximates the geoid, which is the truer, imperfect figure of the Earth, or other planetary body, as opposed to a perfect, smooth, and unaltered sphere, which factors in the undulations of the bodies' gravity due to variations in the composition and density of the interior, as well as the subsequent flattening caused by the centrifugal force from the rotation of these massive objects (for planetary bodies that do rotate). Because of their relative simplicity, reference ellipsoids are used as a preferred surface on which geodetic network computations are performed and point coordinates such as latitude, longitude, and elevation are defined.

In the context of standardization and geographic applications, a geodesic reference ellipsoid is the mathematical model used as foundation by spatial reference system or geodetic datum definitions.

== Ellipsoid parameters ==
In geophysics, geodesy, and related areas, the word 'ellipsoid' is understood to mean 'oblate ellipsoid of revolution', and the older term 'oblate spheroid' is hardly used. For bodies that cannot be well approximated by an ellipsoid of revolution a triaxial (or scalene) ellipsoid is used.

The shape of an ellipsoid of revolution is determined by the shape parameters of that ellipse. The semi-major axis of the ellipse, a, becomes the equatorial radius of the ellipsoid: the semi-minor axis of the ellipse, b, becomes the distance from the centre to either pole. These two lengths completely specify the shape of the ellipsoid.

In geodesy publications, however, it is common to specify the semi-major axis (equatorial radius) a and the flattening f, defined as:
$$f=\frac{a-b}{a}.$$
That is, f is the amount of flattening at each pole, relative to the radius at the equator. This is often expressed as a fraction 1/m; m = 1/f then being the "inverse flattening". A great many other ellipse parameters are used in geodesy but they can all be related to one or two of the set a, b and f.

A great many ellipsoids have been used to model the Earth in the past, with different assumed values of a and b as well as different assumed positions of the center and different axis orientations relative to the solid Earth. Starting in the late twentieth century, improved measurements of satellite orbits and star positions have provided extremely accurate determinations of the Earth's center of mass and of its axis of revolution; and those parameters have been adopted also for all modern reference ellipsoids.

The ellipsoid WGS-84, widely used for mapping and satellite navigation has f close to 1/300 (more precisely, 1/298.257223563, by definition), corresponding to a difference of the major and minor semi-axes of approximately 21 km (13 miles) (more precisely, 21.3846857548205 km). For comparison, Earth's Moon is even less elliptical, with a flattening of less than 1/825, while Jupiter is visibly oblate at about 1/15 and one of Saturn's triaxial moons, Telesto, is highly flattened, with f between 1/3 and 1/2 (meaning that the polar diameter is between 50% and 67% of the equatorial.

== Determination ==
Arc measurement is the historical method of determining the ellipsoid. Two meridian arc measurements will allow the derivation of two parameters required to specify a reference ellipsoid. For example, if the measurements were hypothetically performed exactly over the equator plane and either geographical pole, the radii of curvature so obtained would be related to the equatorial radius and the polar radius, respectively a and b (see: Earth polar and equatorial radius of curvature). Then, the flattening would readily follow from its definition:
$$f=(a-b)/a.$$

For two arc measurements each at arbitrary average latitudes $\varphi_i$, $i=1,\,2$, the solution starts from an initial approximation for the equatorial radius $a_0$ and for the flattening $f_0$. The theoretical Earth's meridional radius of curvature $M_0(\varphi_i)$ can be calculated at the latitude of each arc measurement as:
$$M_0(\varphi_i)=\frac{a (1-e^2)}{(1-e_0^2\sin^2\varphi_i)^\frac{3}{2}}$$
where $e_0^2 = 2f_0-f_0^2$. Then discrepancies between empirical and theoretical values of the radius of curvature can be formed as $\delta M_i=M_i-M_0(\varphi_i)$. Finally, corrections for the initial equatorial radius $\delta a$ and the flattening $\delta f$ can be solved by means of a system of linear equations formulated via linearization of $M$:
$$\delta M_i \approx \delta a (\partial M / \partial a) + \delta f (\partial M / \partial f)$$
where the partial derivatives are:
$$\partial M / \partial a \approx 1$$
$$\partial M / \partial f \approx -2 a_0 (1-1.5 \sin^2\varphi_i)$$

Longer arcs with multiple intermediate-latitude determinations can completely determine the ellipsoid that best fits the surveyed region. In practice, multiple arc measurements are used to determine the ellipsoid parameters by the method of least squares adjustment. The parameters determined are usually the semi-major axis, $a$, and any of the semi-minor axis, $b$, flattening, or eccentricity.

Regional-scale systematic effects observed in the radius of curvature measurements reflect the geoid undulation and the deflection of the vertical, as explored in astrogeodetic leveling.

Gravimetry is another technique for determining Earth's flattening, as per Clairaut's theorem.

Modern geodesy no longer uses simple meridian arcs or ground triangulation networks, but the methods of satellite geodesy, especially satellite gravimetry.

== Geodetic coordinates ==
Geodetic coordinates P(ɸ,λ,h)

Geodetic coordinates are a type of curvilinear orthogonal coordinate system used in geodesy based on a reference ellipsoid. They include geodetic latitude (north/south) ϕ, longitude (east/west) λ, and ellipsoidal height h (also known as geodetic height). The triad is also known as Earth ellipsoidal coordinates (not to be confused with ellipsoidal-harmonic coordinates).

== History ==
In 1687 Isaac Newton published the Principia in which he included a proof that a rotating self-gravitating fluid body in equilibrium takes the form of a flattened ("oblate") ellipsoid of revolution, generated by an ellipse rotated around its minor diameter; a shape which he termed an oblate spheroid.

In 1669, Jean Picard was the first to use a telescope with cross hairs to in his measurements of the meridian arc through Paris. His value for the radius of Earth was only 0.01% off the modern value and it was used by Isaac Newton for his calculations relate to the law of gravity.

In 1666, astronomer Jean-Dominique Cassini discovered that Jupiter was flatter at its poles. Another astronmer, Jean Richer, observed different pendulum timing during his 1672 trip Cayenne near the equator compared to the same pendulum swinging in Paris. This observation was confirmed and eventually explained by Newton as increased gravity at the equator. Christiaan Huygens found out the centrifugal force which explained variations of gravitational acceleration depending on latitude.

In 1743, Alexis Clairaut proposed a theorem which suggested that the study of variations in gravitational acceleration was a way to determine the figure of the Earth, whose crucial parameter was the flattening of the Earth ellipsoid. Clairaut's results showed that the length of a seconds pendulum would vary with position on the Earth's ellipsoid. Towards the end of the 18th century, the geodesists sought to reconcile the values of flattening drawn from the measurements of meridian arcs with that given by Clairaut's theorem drawn from the measurement of gravity. The Weights and Measures Commission would, in 1799, adopt a flattening of (1/334) based on analysis by Pierre-Simon Laplace who combined the arc of Peru and the data of the meridian arc of Delambre and Méchain. The flattening values was one of the contributing factors to difference between defined value of the metre and its proposed definition as a fraction of the meridian.

In 1837, Friedrich Wilhelm Bessel published values for an Earth ellipsoid he calculated from several arc measurements given a value for the flattening of the Earth as (1/299.15). This value is close to the modern value and was used for over a hundred years.

Discovery of the method of least squares by Adrien-Marie Legendre and separately by Carl Gauss increased the accuracy of arc measurements. With more accurate data, inconsistencies in the value of the ellipsoid parameters emerged. Gauss and Bessel began to distinguish different concepts for the figure of the Earth. A simple model for irregular topographic surface is the ellipsoid, but a different approach with the geoid, a surface everywhere perpendicular to a plumb line, matching sea level in the oceans and which gives a reference surface for altitudes above sea level. Gauss gave the precise definition of the "geometrical earth surface" in 1828 and Johann Benedict Listing renamed it the geoid in 1872. It differs from the ellipsoid by less than 100 meters over the surface of the Earth.

=== Historical Earth ellipsoids ===
Equatorial (a), polar (b) and mean Earth radii as defined in the 1984 World Geodetic System revision (not to scale)

The reference ellipsoid models listed below have had utility in geodetic work and many are still in use. The older ellipsoids are named for the individual who derived them and the year of development is given. In 1887 the English surveyor Colonel Alexander Ross Clarke CB FRS RE was awarded the Gold Medal of the Royal Society for his work in determining the figure of the Earth. The international ellipsoid was developed by John Fillmore Hayford in 1910 and adopted by the International Union of Geodesy and Geophysics (IUGG) in 1924, which recommended it for international use.

At the 1967 meeting of the IUGG held in Lucerne, Switzerland, the ellipsoid called Geodetic Reference System 1967 (GRS-67) was recommended for adoption. The new ellipsoid was not recommended to replace the International Ellipsoid 1924, but was advocated for use where a greater degree of accuracy is required. It became a part of the GRS-67 which was approved and adopted at the 1971 meeting of the IUGG held in Moscow. It is used in Australia for the Australian Geodetic Datum and in the South American Datum 1969.

The GRS-80 (Geodetic Reference System 1980) as approved and adopted by the IUGG at its Canberra, Australia meeting of 1979 is based on the equatorial radius (semi-major axis of Earth ellipsoid) $a$, total mass $GM$, dynamic form factor $J_2$ and angular velocity of rotation $\omega$, making the inverse flattening $1/f$ a derived quantity. The minute difference in $1/f$ seen between GRS-80 and WGS-84 results from an unintentional truncation in the latter's defining constants: while the WGS-84 was designed to adhere closely to the GRS-80, incidentally the WGS-84 derived flattening turned out to differ slightly from the GRS-80 flattening because the normalized second degree zonal harmonic gravitational coefficient, that was derived from the GRS-80 value for $J_2$, was truncated to eight significant digits in the normalization process.

An ellipsoidal model describes only the ellipsoid's geometry and a normal gravity field formula to go with it. Commonly an ellipsoidal model is part of a more encompassing geodetic datum. For example, the older ED-50 (European Datum 1950) is based on the Hayford or International Ellipsoid. WGS-84 is peculiar in that the same name is used for both the complete geodetic reference system and its component ellipsoidal model. Nevertheless, the two concepts—ellipsoidal model and geodetic reference system—remain distinct.

Note that the same ellipsoid may be known by different names. It is best to mention the defining constants for unambiguous identification.

Reference ellipsoid name	Equatorial radius (m)	Polar radius (m)	Inverse flattening	Where used
Maupertuis (1738)	6,397,300	6,363,806.283	191	France
Plessis (1817)	6,376,523.0	6,355,862.9333	308.64	France
Everest (1830)	6,377,299.365	6,356,098.359	300.80172554	India
Everest 1830 Modified (1967)	6,377,304.063	6,356,103.0390	300.8017	West Malaysia & Singapore
Everest 1830 (1967 Definition)	6,377,298.556	6,356,097.550	300.8017	Brunei & East Malaysia
Airy (1830)	6,377,563.396	6,356,256.909	299.3249646	Britain
Bessel (1841)	6,377,397.155	6,356,078.963	299.1528128	Europe, Japan
Clarke (1866)	6,378,206.4	6,356,583.8	294.9786982	North America
Clarke (1878)	6,378,190	6,356,456	293.4659980	North America
Clarke (1880)	6,378,249.145	6,356,514.870	293.465	France, Africa
Helmert (1906)	6,378,200	6,356,818.17	298.3	Egypt
Hayford (1910)	6,378,388	6,356,911.946	297	US
International (1924)	6,378,388	6,356,911.946	297	Europe
Krassovsky (1940)	6,378,245	6,356,863.019	298.3	USSR, Russia, Romania
WGS66 (1966)	6,378,145	6,356,759.769	298.25	USA/DoD
Australian National (1966)	6,378,160	6,356,774.719	298.25	Australia
New International (1967)	6,378,157.5	6,356,772.2	298.24961539	
GRS-67 (1967)	6,378,160	6,356,774.516	298.247167427	
South American (1969)	6,378,160	6,356,774.719	298.25	South America
WGS-72 (1972)	6,378,135	6,356,750.52	298.26	USA/DoD
GRS-80 (1979)	6,378,137	6,356,752.3141	298.257222101	Global ITRS
WGS-84 (1984)	6,378,137	6,356,752.3142	298.257223563	Global GPS
IERS (1989)	6,378,136	6,356,751.302	298.257	
IERS (2003)	6,378,136.6	6,356,751.9	298.25642	

== Equipotential ellipsoid ==
Combining the ellipsoid's two geometric parameters with two gravimetric parameters, such as Earth mass and rotation rate, defines an equipotential ellipsoid or level ellipsoid, over which gravity normal potential is uniform; it allows the computation of normal gravity as the spatial gradient of normal potential. Models such as GRS80 and WGS84 include four parameters, defining both a geometric ellipsoid and an equipotential ellipsoid.

== See also ==
- Equatorial bulge
- Earth radius of curvature
- Geodetic datum
- Geoid
- Great ellipse
- Meridian arc
- Planetary coordinate system
- History of geodesy
- Planetary ellipsoid
- Timeline of Earth estimates
