= Flattening =

Measure of compression between circle to ellipse or sphere to an ellipsoid of revolution

A circle of radius a compressed to an ellipse.

A sphere of radius a compressed to an oblate ellipsoid of revolution.

Flattening is a measure of the compression of a circle or sphere along a diameter to form an ellipse or an ellipsoid of revolution (spheroid) respectively. Other terms used are ellipticity, or oblateness. The usual notation for flattening is $f$ and its definition in terms of the semi-axes $a$ and $b$ of the resulting ellipse or ellipsoid is

$$f =\frac {a - b}{a}.$$

The compression factor is $b/a$ in each case; for the ellipse, this is also its aspect ratio.

== Definitions ==
There are three variants: the flattening $f,$ sometimes called the first flattening, as well as two other "flattenings" $f'$ and $n,$ each sometimes called the second flattening, sometimes only given a symbol, or sometimes called the second flattening and third flattening, respectively.

In the following, $a$ is the larger dimension (e.g. semimajor axis), whereas $b$ is the smaller (semiminor axis). All flattenings are zero for a circle (a = b).

(First) flattening	$f$	$\frac{a-b}{a}$	Fundamental. Geodetic reference ellipsoids are specified by giving $\frac{1}{f}\,\!$
Second flattening	$f'$	$\frac{a-b}{b}$	Rarely used.
Third flattening	$n$	$\frac{a-b}{a+b}$	Used in geodetic calculations as a small expansion parameter.

== Identities ==
The flattenings can be related to each-other:

$$\begin{align}
f = \frac{2n}{1 + n}, \\[5mu]
n = \frac{f}{2 - f}.
\end{align}$$

The flattenings are related to other parameters of the ellipse. For example,

$$\begin{align}
\frac ba &= 1-f = \frac{1-n}{1+n}, \\[5mu]
e^2 &= 2f-f^2 = \frac{4n}{(1+n)^2}, \\[5mu]
f &= 1-\sqrt{1-e^2},
\end{align}$$

where $e$ is the eccentricity.

== See also ==
- Earth flattening
- Eccentricity (mathematics) § Ellipses
- Equatorial bulge
- Ovality
- Planetary flattening
- Sphericity
- Roundness (object)
