= Earth tide =

Displacement of the solid Earth's surface caused by the gravity of the Moon and Sun

Earth tide (also known as solid-Earth tide, crustal tide, body tide, bodily tide or land tide) is the displacement of the solid earth's surface caused by the gravity of the Moon and Sun. Its main component has meter-level amplitude at periods of about 12 hours and longer. The largest body tide constituents are semi-diurnal, but there are also significant diurnal, semi-annual, and fortnightly contributions. Though the gravitational force causing earth tides and ocean tides is the same, the responses are quite different.

== Tide raising force ==
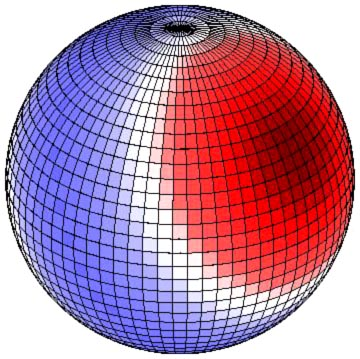
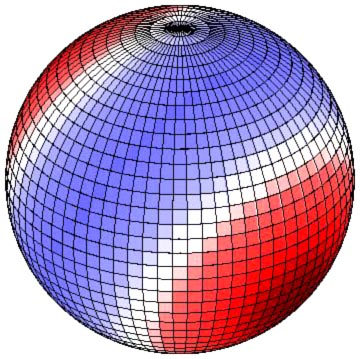
Lunar tidal force: these images depict the Moon directly over 30° N (or 30° S) viewed from above the Northern Hemisphere, showing both sides of the planet. Red up, blue down.

The larger of the periodic gravitational forces is from the Moon but that of the Sun is also important. The images here show lunar tidal force when the Moon appears directly over 30° N (or 30° S). This pattern remains fixed with the red area directed toward (or directly away from) the Moon. Red indicates upward pull, blue downward. If, for example the Moon is directly over 90° W (or 90° E), the red areas are centred on the western northern hemisphere, on the upper right. If for example the Moon is directly over 90° W (90° E), the centre of the red area is 30° N, 90° W and 30° S, 90° E, and the centre of the bluish band follows the great circle equidistant from those points. At 30° latitude a strong peak occurs once per lunar day, giving a significant diurnal force at that latitude. Along the equator two equally sized peaks (and depressions) impart semi-diurnal force.

== Body tide components ==
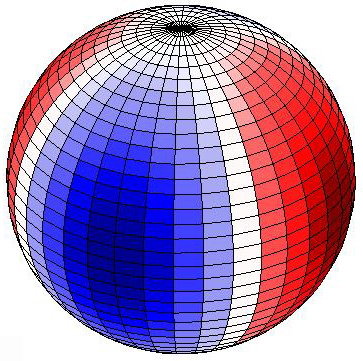
Vertical displacements of sectorial movement.
Red up, blue down.

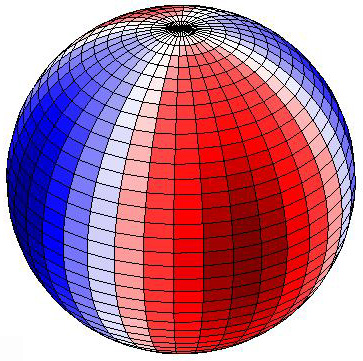
East-west displacements of sectorial movement.
Red east, blue west.

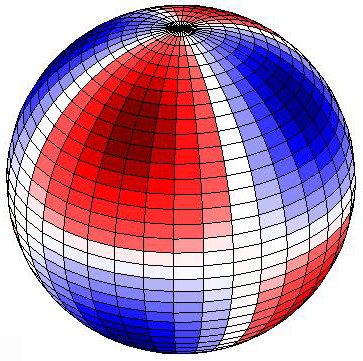
North-south displacements of sectorial movement.
Red north, blue south.

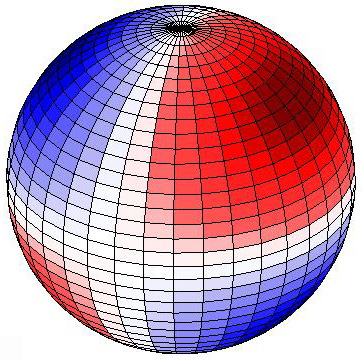
Vertical displacements of tesseral movement.
Red up, blue down.

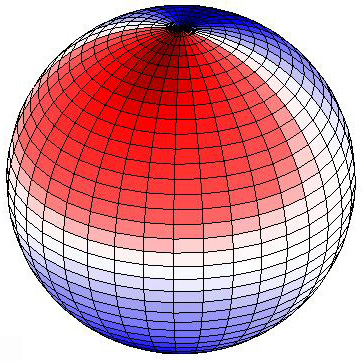
East-West displacements of tesseral movement.
Red east, blue west.

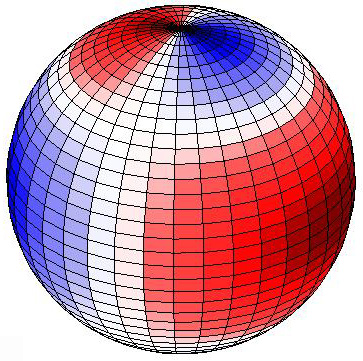
North-South displacements of tesseral movement.
Red north, blue south.

The Earth tide encompasses the entire body of the Earth and is unhindered by the thin crust and land masses of the surface, on scales that make the rigidity of rock irrelevant. Ocean tides are a consequence of tangent forces (see: equilibrium tide) and the resonance of the same driving forces with water movement periods in ocean basins accumulated over many days, so that their amplitude and timing are quite different and vary over short distances of just a few hundred kilometres. The oscillation periods of the Earth as a whole are not near the astronomical periods, so its flexing is due to the forces of the moment.

The tide components with a period near twelve hours have a lunar amplitude (Earth bulge/depression distances) that are a little more than twice the height of the solar amplitudes, as tabulated below. At new and full moon, the Sun and the Moon are aligned, and the lunar and the solar tidal maxima and minima (bulges and depressions) add together for the greatest tidal range at particular latitudes. At first- and third-quarter phases of the moon, lunar and solar tides are perpendicular, and the tidal range is at a minimum. The semi-diurnal tides go through one full cycle (a high and low tide) about once every 12 hours and one full cycle of maximum height (a spring and neap tide) about once every 14 days.

The semi-diurnal tide (one maximum every 12 or so hours) is primarily lunar (only S_{2} is purely solar) and gives rise to sectorial (or sectoral) deformations which rise and fall at the same time along the same longitude. Sectorial variations of vertical and east-west displacements are maximum at the equator and vanish at the poles. There are two cycles along each latitude, the bulges opposite one another, and the depressions similarly opposed. The diurnal tide is lunisolar, and gives rise to tesseral deformations. The vertical and east-west movement is maximum at 45° latitude and is zero on the equator and at the poles. The tesseral variation has one cycle per latitude, one bulge and one depression; the bulges are opposed (antipodal), in other words the western part of the northern hemisphere and the eastern part of the southern hemisphere, for example. Similarly, the depressions are opposed, in this case the eastern part of the northern hemisphere and the western part of the southern hemisphere. Finally, fortnightly and semi-annual tides have zonal deformations (constant along a circle of latitude), as the Moon or Sun gravitation is directed alternately away from the northern and southern hemispheres due to tilt. There is zero vertical displacement at 35°16' latitude.

Since these displacements affect the vertical direction, the east-west and north-south variations are often tabulated in milliarcseconds for astronomical use. The vertical displacement is frequently tabulated in μGal, since the gradient of gravity is location dependent, so that the distance conversion is only approximately 3 μGal per centimetre.

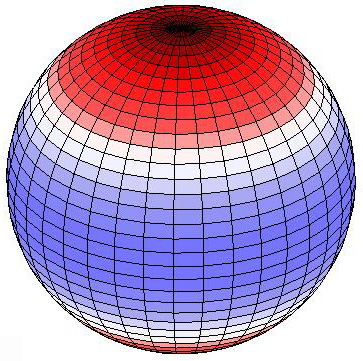
Vertical displacements of zonal movement. Red up, blue down.

=== Tidal constituents ===
Principal tidal constituents. The amplitudes may vary from those listed within several per cent.

See also Theory of tides#Tidal constituents.

Semi-diurnal
Species	Tidal constituent	Period	Amplitude (mm)	
Species	Tidal constituent	Period	vertical	horiz.
Principal lunar semidiurnal	M_{2}	12.421 h	384.83	53.84
Principal solar semidiurnal	S_{2}	12 h	179.05	25.05
Larger lunar elliptic semidiurnal	N_{2}	12.658 h	73.69	10.31
Lunisolar semidiurnal	K_{2}	11.967 h	48.72	6.82
Diurnal
Species	Tidal constituent	Period	Amplitude (mm)	
Species	Tidal constituent	Period	vertical	horiz.
Lunar diurnal	K_{1}	23.934 h	191.78	32.01
Lunar diurnal	O_{1}	25.819 h	158.11	22.05
Solar diurnal	P_{1}	24.066 h	70.88	10.36
	φ_{1}	23.804 h	3.44	0.43
	ψ_{1}	23.869 h	2.72	0.21
Solar diurnal	S_{1}	24 h	1.65	0.25
Long Term
Species	Tidal constituent	Period	Amplitude (mm)	
Species	Tidal constituent	Period	vertical	horiz.
Lunisolar fortnightly	M_{f}	13.661 d	40.36	5.59
Lunar monthly	M_{m}	27.555 d	21.33	2.96
Solar semiannual	S_{sa}	0.5 yr	18.79	2.60
	Lunar node	18.613 yr	16.92	2.34
Solar annual	S_{a}	1 yr	2.97	0.41

== Ocean tidal loading ==
Ocean tidal loading is the deformation of the underlying crust in response to periodic variations of water mass associated with the ocean tide, and is typically one order of magnitude smaller than the body tide deformation. Sensitive instruments far inland often have to make similar corrections. Atmospheric loading and storm events may also be measurable, though the masses in movement are less weighty.

== Effects ==
Volcanologists use the regular, predictable Earth tide movements to calibrate and test sensitive volcano deformation monitoring instruments; tides may also trigger volcanic events.

The semidiurnal M_{2} amplitude of terrestrial tides can reach about 55 cm (22 in) at the equator which is important in geodesy using Global Positioning System, very-long-baseline interferometry, and satellite laser ranging measurements. The semi-diurnal Earth tides are nearly in phase with the Moon with a lag in the earth's principal semidiurnal lunar tide of 0.204°±0.047°, corresponding to a time lag of approximately 25 seconds. This implies that the solid tide dissipates at least 110 GW (150,000,000 hp) of tidal power, or about 5% of what the ocean tides dissipate.

To make precise astronomical angular measurements requires accurate knowledge of the Earth's rate of rotation (length of day, precession, in addition to nutation), which is influenced by Earth tides (see also: pole tide). Terrestrial tides also need to be taken in account in the case of some particle physics experiments. For instance, at the CERN or the SLAC National Accelerator Laboratory, the very large particle accelerators were designed while taking terrestrial tides into account for proper operation. Among the effects that need to be taken into account are circumference deformation for circular accelerators and particle-beam energy.

== In other astronomical objects ==
Body tides also exist in other astronomical objects, such as planets and moons. In Earth's moon, body tides "vary by about ±0.1 m each month." It plays a key role in long-term dynamics of planetary systems. For example, body tides dissipate energy, slowing the spin of satellites until they lock into a spin-orbit resonance. Thus, the Moon is captured in a 1:1 spin-orbit resonance, always showing the Earth one side, while Mercury is trapped in a 3:2 resonance with the Sun. For the same reason, it is believed that many of the exoplanets are captured in higher spin-orbit resonances with their host stars.

== See also ==
- Love numbers

== Bibliography ==
- McCully, James Greig, Beyond the Moon, A Conversational, Common Sense Guide to Understanding the Tides, World Scientific Publishing Co, Singapore, 2006.
- Paul Melchior, Earth Tides, Pergamon Press, Oxford, 1983.
- Wylie, Francis E, Tides and the Pull of the Moon, The Stephen Greene Press, Brattleboro, Vermont, 1979.
