= International Latitude Service =

Observatory in the United States

International Latitude Observatory
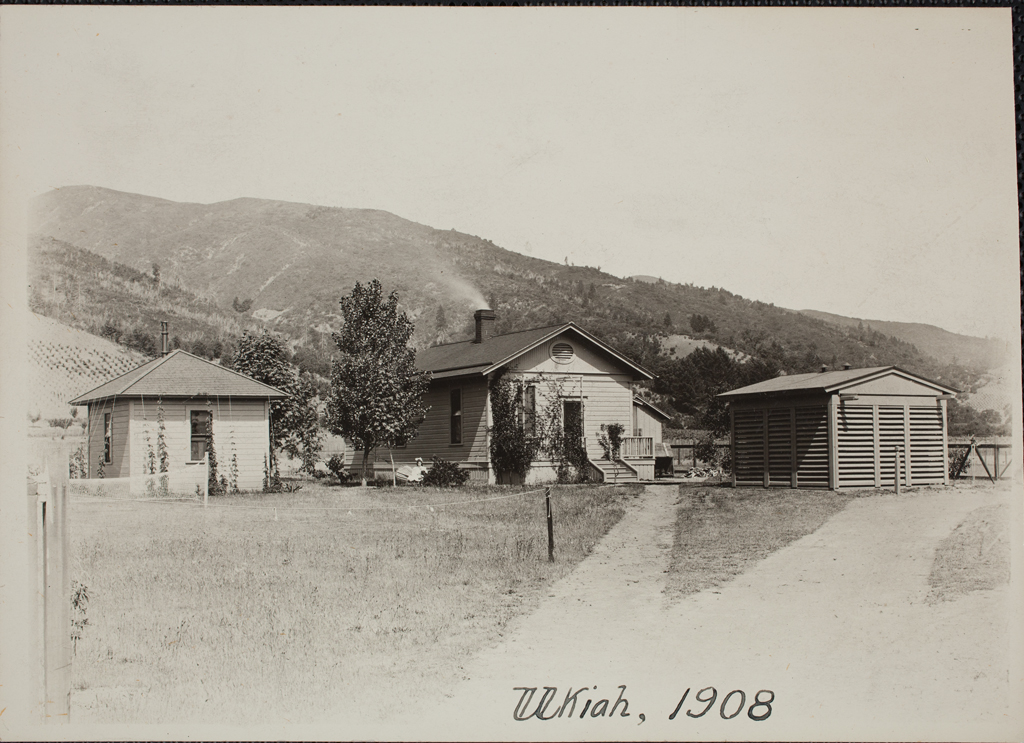
- International latitude observatory of Ukiah, California, 1908
- Alternative names: International Polar Motion Service
- Location: United States
- Related media on Commons

The International Latitude Service was created by the International Geodetic Association in 1899 to study variations in latitude caused by polar motion, precession, or "wobble" of the Earth's axis.

In 1891, at the meeting of the Permanent Commission of the International Geodetic Association in Florence, Wilhelm Foerster referred to the discovery by Seth Carlo Chandler of the polar motion predicted by Leonhard Euler in 1765 and his impact on the determination latitudes. He proposed that the International Geodetic Association implement a systematic study of this important phenomenon. In 1895, the creation of the International Latitude Service was decided by the International Geodesic Association. Its central office was based in Potsdam and headed by Friedrich Robert Helmert. Regular observations began in 1899. After 1916, the operations of the International Latitudes Service continued under the aegis of the Reduced Geodetic Association among Neutral States presided by Raoul Gautier director of Geneva Observatory.

The original International Latitude Observatories were a system of six observatories located near the parallel of 39° 08' north latitude. The alignment of all six stations along the parallel helped the observatories to perform uniform data analysis. The original six observatories were located in:

- Gaithersburg, Maryland, United States
- Cincinnati, Ohio, United States
- Ukiah, California, United States
- Mizusawa, Iwate, Japan
- Charjui, Turkmenistan
- Carloforte, Italy

Twelve groups of stars were studied in the program, each group containing six pairs of stars. Each night, each station observed two of the star groups along a preset schedule and later compared the data against the measurements taken by the sister stations. Economic difficulties and war caused the closings of some of the original stations, though a newer station was created in Uzbekistan after World War I. The data collected by the observatories over the years still has use to scientists, and has been applied to studies of polar motion, the physical properties of the Earth, climatology and satellite tracking and navigation.

The final six observatories were located, in order of Longitude (E to W), in:

- Gaithersburg, Maryland, USA, Gaithersburg Latitude Observatory:
- Cincinnati, Ohio, USA:
- Ukiah, California, USA:
- Mizusawa, Japan, National Institutes of Natural Sciences National Astronomical Observatory of Japan, Mizusawa VERA Observatory:
- Kitab, in Uzbekistan:
- Carloforte, Italy:

The ILS was renamed International Polar Motion Service (IPMS) in 1962. It was replaced when the International Earth Rotation Service (IERS) was established in 1987.

== See also ==
- List of astronomical observatories
