= Long-period tides =

Small amplitude gravitational tides

Long-period tides or low-frequency tides are gravitational tides with periods longer than one day or frequencies lower than one cycle per day. They typically have amplitudes of a few centimeters or less. Long-period tidal constituents with relatively strong forcing include the lunar fortnightly (Mf) and lunar monthly (Ms) as well as the solar semiannual (Ssa) and solar annual (Sa) constituents.

An analysis of the changing distance of the Earth relative to Sun, Moon, and Jupiter by Pierre-Simon de Laplace in the 18th century showed that the periods at which gravity varies cluster into three species: the semi-diurnal and the diurnal tide constituents, which have periods of a day or less, and the long-period tidal constituents.

In addition to having periods longer than a day, long-period tidal forcing is distinguished from that of the first and second species by being zonally symmetric. The long period tides are also distinguished by the way in which the oceans respond: forcings occur sufficiently slowly that they do not excite surface gravity waves. The excitation of surface gravity waves is responsible for the high amplitude semi-diurnal tides in the Bay of Fundy, for example. In contrast, the ocean responds to long period tidal forcing with a combination of an equilibrium tide along with a possible excitation of barotropic Rossby wave normal modes

Types of tides

== Formation mechanism ==
Gravitational tides are caused by changes in the relative location of the Earth, Sun, and Moon, whose orbits are perturbed slightly by Jupiter. Newton's law of universal gravitation states that the gravitational force between a mass at a reference point on the surface of the Earth and another object such as the Moon is inversely proportional to the square of the distance between them. The declination of the Moon relative to the Earth means that, as the Moon orbits the Earth, during half the lunar cycle the Moon is closer to the Northern Hemisphere, and during the other half the Moon is closer to the Southern Hemisphere. This periodic shift in distance gives rise to the lunar fortnightly tidal constituent. The ellipticity of the lunar orbit gives rise to a lunar monthly tidal constituent. Because of the nonlinear dependence of the force on distance, additional tidal constituents exist with frequencies which are the sum and differences of these fundamental frequencies. Additional fundamental frequencies are introduced by the motion of the Sun and Jupiter, thus tidal constituents exist at all of these frequencies as well as all of the sums and differences of these frequencies, etc. The mathematical description of the tidal forces is greatly simplified by expressing the forces in terms of gravitational potentials. Because the Earth is approximately a sphere and the orbits are approximately circular it also turns out to be very convenient to describe these gravitational potentials in spherical coordinates using spherical harmonic expansions.

== Oceanic response ==
Several factors need to be considered in order to determine the ocean's response to tidal forcing. These include loading effects and interactions with the solid Earth as the ocean mass is redistributed by the tides, and self-gravitation effects of the ocean on itself. However the most important is the dynamical response of the ocean to the tidal forcing, conveniently expressed in terms of Laplace's tidal equations. Because of their long periods, surface gravity waves cannot be easily excited, and so the long period tides were long assumed to be nearly in equilibrium with the forcing, in which case the tide heights should be proportional to the disturbing potential and the induced currents should be very weak. Thus it came as a surprise when in 1967 Carl Wunsch published the tide heights for two constituents in the tropical Pacific with distinctly nonequilibrium tides. More recently there has been confirmation from satellite sea level measurements of the nonequilibrium nature of the lunar fortnightly tide (GARY D. EGBERT and RICHARD D. RAY, 2003: Deviation of Long-Period Tides from Equilibrium: Kinematics and Geostrophy, J. Phys. Oceanogr., 33, 822-839), for example in the tropical Atlantic. Similar calculations for the lunar monthly tide show that this lower frequency constituent is closer to equilibrium than the fortnightly.

A number of ideas have been put forward regarding how the ocean should respond to long period tidal forcing. Several authors in the 1960s and 1970s had suggested that the tidal forcing might generate resonant barotropic Rossby Wave modes, however these modes are extremely sensitive to ocean dissipation and in any event are only weakly excited by the long period tidal forcing (Carton, J.A., 1983: The variation with frequency of the long-period tides. J. Geophys. Res.,88,7563–7571). Another idea was that long period Kelvin Waves could be excited. More recently Egbert and Ray presented numerical modeling results suggesting that the nonequilibrium tidal elevation of the lunar fortnightly is more closely connected to the exchange of mass between the ocean basins.

== Effect on lunar orbit ==
The effect of long-period tides on lunar orbit is a controversial topic, some literatures conclude that the long-period tides accelerate the Moon and slow down the Earth. However Cheng found that dissipation of the long-period tides brakes the Moon and actually accelerates the Earth's rotation. To explain this, they assumed the Earth's rotation depends not directly on the derivation of the forcing potential for the long period tides, so the form and period of the long-period constituents is independent of the rotation rate. For these constituents, the Moon (or Sun) can be thought of as orbiting a non-rotating Earth in a plane with the appropriate inclination to the equator. Then the tidal "bulge" lags behind the orbiting Moon thus decelerating it in its orbit (bringing it closer to the Earth), and by angular momentum conservation, the Earth's rotation must accelerate. But this argument is qualitative, and a quantitative resolution of the conflicting conclusions is still needed.

== Pole tide ==
One additional tidal constituent results from the centrifugal forces due, in turn, to the so-called polar motion of the Earth. The latter has nothing to do with the gravitational torques acting on the Earth by the Sun and Moon, but is "excited" by geophysical mass transports on or in the Earth itself given the (slight) oblateness of the Earth's figure, which actually gives rise to an Euler-type rotational motion with a period of about 433 days for the Earth known as the Chandler wobble (after its first discoverer Seth Chandler in the early 1900s). Incidentally, the Eulerian wobble is analogous to the wobbling motion of a spinning frisbee thrown not-so-perfectly. Observationally, the (excited) Chandler wobble is a major component in the Earth's polar motion. One effect of the polar motion is to perturb the otherwise steady centrifugal force felt by the Earth, causing the Earth (and the oceans) to deform slightly at the corresponding period, known as the pole tide. Like the long-period tides, the pole tide has been assumed to be in equilibrium and an examination of the pole tide at ocean-basin scales seems to be consistent with that assumption. The equilibrium amplitude of the pole tide is about 5 mm at it maximum at 45 degrees N. and S. latitudes; it is most clearly observed in satellite altimetry maps of sea surface height. At regional scales, though, the observational record is less clear. For example, tide gauge records in the North Sea show a signal that seemed to be a non-equilibrium pole tide which Wunsch has suggested is due to a resonance connected with the excitation of barotropic Rossby waves, but O'Connor and colleagues suggest it is actually wind-forced instead.

== Usage ==
The long-period tides are very useful for geophysicists, who use them to calculate the elastic Love number and to understand low frequency and large-scale oceanic motions.
