= Day =

Time of one rotation around a planet axis

A quarter-day cycle at Midtown Manhattan, from afternoon to dusk

A day is the time period of a full rotation of the Earth with respect to the Sun. On average, this is 24 hours (86,400 seconds). As a day passes at a given location it experiences morning, afternoon, evening, and night. This daily cycle drives circadian rhythms in many organisms, which are vital to many life processes.

A collection of sequential days is organized into calendars as dates, almost always into weeks, months, and years. A solar calendar organizes dates based on the Sun's annual cycle, giving consistent start dates for the four seasons from year to year. A lunar calendar organizes dates based on the Moon's lunar phase.

In common usage, a day starts at midnight, written as 00:00 or 12:00 am in 24- or 12-hour clocks, respectively. Because the time of midnight varies between locations, time zones are set up to facilitate the use of a uniform standard time. Other conventions exist for marking the beginning and end of days, such as the Jewish religious calendar which counts days beginning at sunset, or in astronomy, in which a day begins at noon so that observations throughout a single night are recorded as happening on the same day.

In specific applications, the definition of a day is slightly modified, such as in the SI day (exactly 86,400 seconds) used for computers and standards keeping, local mean time accounting of the Earth's natural fluctuation of a solar day, and stellar day and sidereal day (using the celestial sphere) used for astronomy. In some countries outside of the tropics, daylight saving time is practiced, and each year there will be one 23-hour civil day and one 25-hour civil day. Due to slight variations in the rotation of the Earth, there are rare times when a leap second will get inserted at the end of a UTC day, and so while almost all days have a duration of 86,400 seconds, there are these exceptional cases of a day with 86,401 seconds (in the half-century spanning 1972 through 2022, there have been a total of 27 leap seconds that have been inserted, so roughly once every other year).

== Etymology ==
The term comes from the Old English term dæġ (/dæj/), with its cognates such as dagur in Icelandic, Tag in German, and dag in Norwegian, Danish, Swedish and Dutch – all stemming from a Proto-Germanic root *dagaz.

== Definitions ==
=== Apparent and mean solar day ===
Earth's rotation imaged by Deep Space Climate Observatory, showing axis tilt

Several definitions of this universal human concept are used according to context, need, and convenience. Besides the day of 24 hours (86,400 seconds), the word day is used for several different spans of time based on the rotation of the Earth around its axis. An important one is the solar day, the time it takes for the Sun to return to its culmination point (its highest point in the sky). Due to an orbit's eccentricity, the Sun resides in one of the orbit's foci instead of the middle. Consequently, due to Kepler's second law, the planet travels at different speeds at various positions in its orbit, and thus a solar day is not the same length of time throughout the orbital year. Because the Earth moves along an eccentric orbit around the Sun while the Earth spins on an inclined axis, this period can be up to 7.9 seconds more than (or less than) 24 hours. In recent decades, the average length of a solar day on Earth has been about 86,400.002 seconds (24.000 000 6 hours). There are currently about 365.2421875 solar days in one mean tropical year.

Ancient custom has a new day starting at either the rising or setting of the Sun on the local horizon (Italian reckoning, for example, being 24 hours from sunset, old style). The exact moment of, and the interval between, two sunrises or sunsets depends on the geographical position (longitude and latitude, as well as altitude), and the time of year (as indicated by ancient hemispherical sundials).

A more constant day can be defined by the Sun passing through the local meridian, which happens at local noon (upper culmination) or midnight (lower culmination). The exact moment is dependent on the geographical longitude, and to a lesser extent on the time of the year. The length of such a day is nearly constant (24 hours ± 30 seconds). This is the time as indicated by modern sundials.

A further improvement defines a fictitious mean Sun that moves with constant speed along the celestial equator; the speed is the same as the average speed of the real Sun, but this removes the variation over a year as the Earth moves along its orbit around the Sun (due to both its velocity and its axial tilt).

In terms of Earth's rotation, the average day length is about 360.9856°. A day lasts for more than 360° of rotation because of the Earth's revolution around the Sun. With a full year being slightly more than 360 days, the Earth's daily orbit around the Sun is slightly less than 1°, so the day is slightly less than 361° of rotation.

Elsewhere in the Solar System or other parts of the universe, a day is a full rotation of other large astronomical objects with respect to its star.

==== Civil day ====
For civil purposes, a common clock time is typically defined for an entire region based on the local mean solar time at a central meridian. Such time zones began to be adopted about the middle of the 19th century when railroads with regularly occurring schedules came into use, with most major countries having adopted them by 1929. As of 2015, throughout the world, 40 such zones are now in use: the central zone, from which all others are defined as offsets, is known as UTC+00, which uses Coordinated Universal Time (UTC).

The most common convention starts the civil day at midnight: this is near the time of the lower culmination of the Sun on the central meridian of the time zone. Such a day may be called a calendar day.

A day is commonly divided into 24 hours, with each hour being made up of 60 minutes, and each minute composed of 60 seconds.

=== Sidereal day ===
Rotation of the dwarf planet Ceres

A sidereal day or stellar day is the span of time it takes for the Earth to make one entire rotation with respect to the celestial background or a distant star (assumed to be fixed). Measuring a day as such is used in astronomy. A sidereal day is about 4 minutes less than a solar day of 24 hours (23 hours 56 minutes and 4.09 seconds), or 0.99726968 of a solar day of 24 hours. There are about 366.2422 stellar days in one mean tropical year (one stellar day more than the number of solar days).

Besides a stellar day on Earth, other bodies in the Solar System have day times, the durations of these being:

Name	Daylength (hours)
Mercury	4222.6
Venus	2802
Earth's Moon	708.7
Mars	24.7
Ceres	9–9.1
Jupiter	9.9
Saturn	10.7
Uranus	17.2
Neptune	16.1
Pluto	153.3

=== In the International System of Units ===
The day is not a unit in the International System of Units (SI), though prior to 2026 it was described as accepted for use with SI. A day, with symbol d, is defined using SI units as 86,400 seconds; the second is the base unit of time in SI units.

=== In decimal and metric time ===
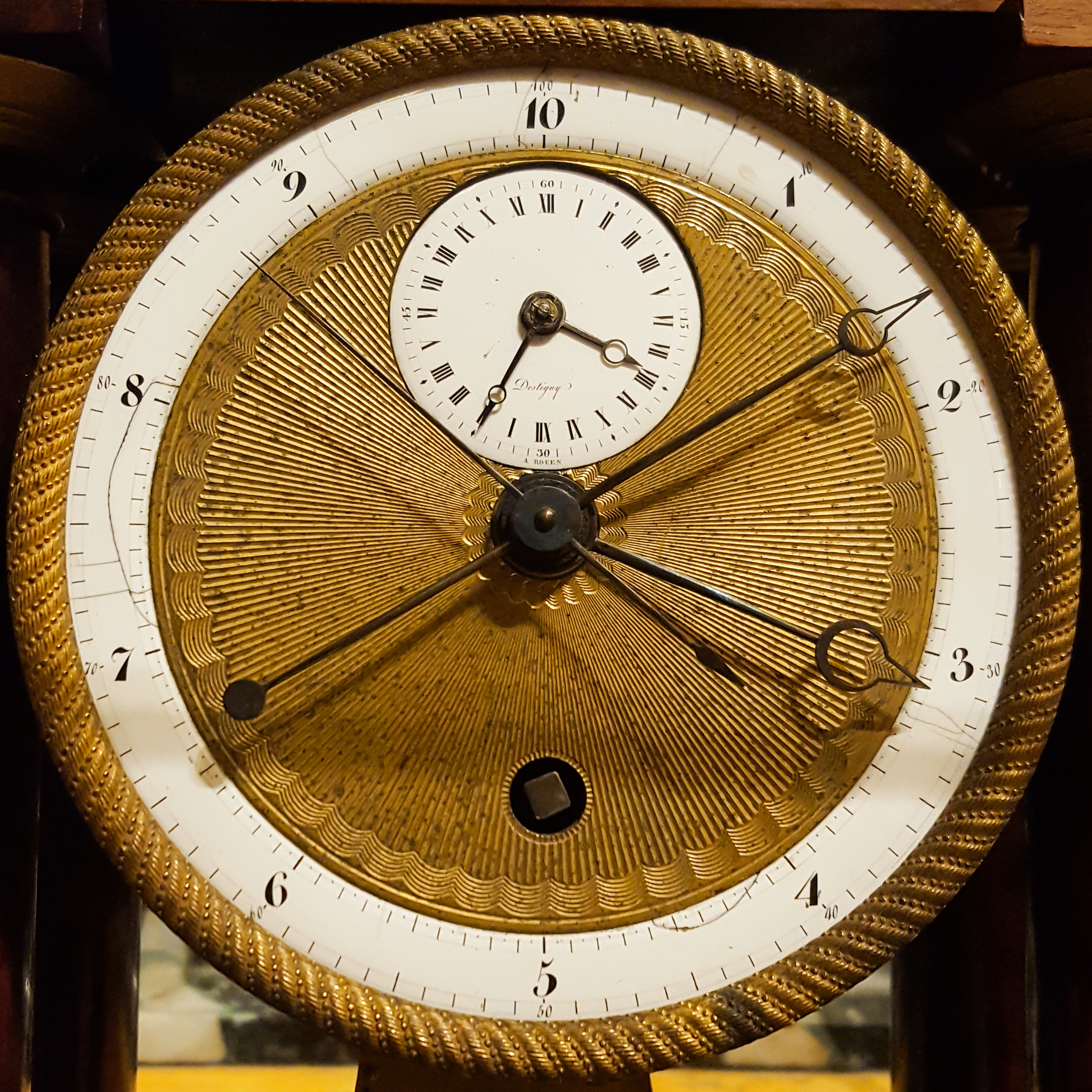
Decimal clock face, made in around the start of the 19th century

Various decimal or metric time proposals have been made, but do not redefine the day, and use the day or sidereal day as a base unit. Metric time uses metric prefixes to keep time. It uses the day as the base unit, and smaller units being fractions of a day: a metric hour (deci) is 1/10 of a day; a metric minute (milli) is 1/1000 of a day; etc. Similarly, in decimal time, the length of a day is static to normal time. A day is also split into 10 hours, and 10 days comprise a décade – the equivalent of a week. 3 décades make a month. Various decimal time proposals which do not redefine the day: Henri de Sarrauton's proposal kept days, and subdivided hours into 100 minutes; in Mendizábal y Tamborel's proposal, the sidereal day was the basic unit, with subdivisions made upon it; and Rey-Pailhade's proposal divided the day 100 cés.

=== Other definitions ===
The word refers to various similarly defined ideas, such as:

Full day

- A full dark and light period, sometimes called a nychthemeron in English, from the Greek for night-day, or more colloquially the term 24 hours. Other languages may also have a separate word for a full day.
- A day counting approximation, for example "See you in three days." or "the following day"
- Part of a date: the day of the year (doy) in ordinal dates, day of the month (dom) in calendar dates or day of the week (dow) in week dates.
- Time regularly spend at paid work on a single work day, cf. man-day and workweek.

Daytime

- The period of light when the Sun is above the local horizon (that is, the time period from sunrise to sunset)
- The time period from first-light "dawn" to last-light "dusk".

Other

- A specific period of the day, which may vary by context, such as "the school day" or "the work day".

== Variations in length ==
Mainly due to tidal deceleration – the Moon's gravitational pull slowing down the Earth's rotation – the Earth's rotational period is slowing. Because of the way the second is defined, the mean length of a solar day is now about 86,400.002 seconds, and is increasing by about 2 milliseconds per century.

Since the rotation rate of the Earth is slowing, the length of a SI second fell out of sync with a second derived from the rotational period. This created the need for leap seconds, which insert extra seconds into Coordinated Universal Time (UTC). Although typically 86,400 SI seconds in duration, a civil day can be either 86,401 or 86,399 SI seconds long on such a day. Other than the two-millisecond variation from tidal deceleration, other factors minutely affect the day's length, which creates an irregularity in the placement of leap seconds. Leap seconds are announced in advance by the International Earth Rotation and Reference Systems Service (IERS), which measures the Earth's rotation and determines whether a leap second is necessary.

=== Geological day lengths ===
Discovered by paleontologist John W. Wells, the day lengths of geological periods have been estimated by measuring sedimentation rings in coral fossils, due to some biological systems being affected by the tide. The length of a day at the Earth's formation is estimated at 6 hours. Arbab I. Arbab plotted day lengths over time and found a curved line. Arbab attributed this to the change of water volume present affecting Earth's rotation.

Date	Geological period	Number of days per year	Duration of the day
Present	Current	365	24 hours
−100 million years	Cretaceous	380	23 hours and 20 minutes
−200 million years	Triassic	390	22 hours and 40 minutes
−300 million years	Carboniferous	400	22 hours
−400 million years	Devonian	410	21 hours and 20 minutes
−500 million years	Cambrian	425	20 hours and 40 minutes

== Boundaries ==
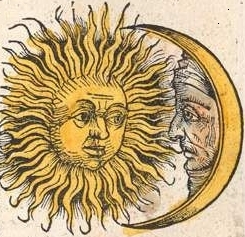
Sun and Moon, Hartmann Schedel's Nuremberg Chronicle, 1493

For most diurnal animals, the day naturally begins at dawn and ends at sunset. Humans, with their cultural norms and scientific knowledge, have employed several different conceptions of the day's boundaries.

In the Hebrew Bible, Genesis 1:5 defines a day in terms of "evening" and "morning" before recounting the creation of the Sun to illuminate it: "And God called the light Day, and the darkness he called Night. And the evening and the morning were the first day." The Jewish day begins at either sunset or nightfall (when three second-magnitude stars appear). Medieval Europe also followed this tradition, known as Florentine reckoning: In this system, a reference like "two hours into the day" meant two hours after sunset and thus times during the evening need to be shifted back one calendar day in modern reckoning. Days such as Christmas Eve, Halloween (“All Hallows’ Eve”), and the Eve of Saint Agnes are remnants of the older pattern when holidays began during the prior evening.

The common convention among the ancient Romans, ancient Chinese and in modern times is for the civil day to begin at midnight, i.e. 00:00, and to last a full 24 hours until 24:00, i.e. 00:00 of the next day. The International Meridian Conference of 1884 resolved

That the Conference expresses the hope that as soon as may be practicable the astronomical and nautical days will be arranged everywhere to begin at midnight.

In ancient Egypt the day was reckoned from sunrise to sunrise.

Prior to 1926, Turkey had two time systems: Turkish, counting the hours from sunset, and French, counting the hours from midnight.

== Parts ==
Humans have divided the day in rough periods, which can have cultural implications, and other effects on humans' biological processes. The parts of the day do not have set times; they can vary by lifestyle or hours of daylight in a given place.

=== Daytime ===
Daytime is the part of the day during which sunlight directly reaches the ground, assuming that there are no obstacles. The length of daytime averages slightly more than half of the 24-hour day. Two effects make daytime on average longer than night. The Sun is not a point but has an apparent size of about 32 minutes of arc. Additionally, the atmosphere refracts sunlight in such a way that some of it reaches the ground even when the Sun is below the horizon by about 34 minutes of arc. So the first light reaches the ground when the centre of the Sun is still below the horizon by about 50 minutes of arc. Thus, daytime is on average around 7 minutes longer than 12 hours.

Daytime is further divided into morning and afternoon. Morning occurs between sunrise and noon. Afternoon occurs between noon and sunset, or between noon and the start of evening. This period of time sees humans' highest body temperature, an increase of traffic collisions, and a decrease of productivity.

=== Twilight ===

Twilight is the period before sunrise and after sunset in which there is natural light but no direct sunlight. The morning twilight begins at dawn and ends at sunrise, while the evening twilight begins at sunset and ends at dusk. Both periods of twilight can be divided into civil twilight, nautical twilight, and astronomical twilight. Civil twilight is when the sun is up to 6 degrees below the horizon; nautical when it is up to 12 degrees below, and astronomical when it is up to 18 degrees below.

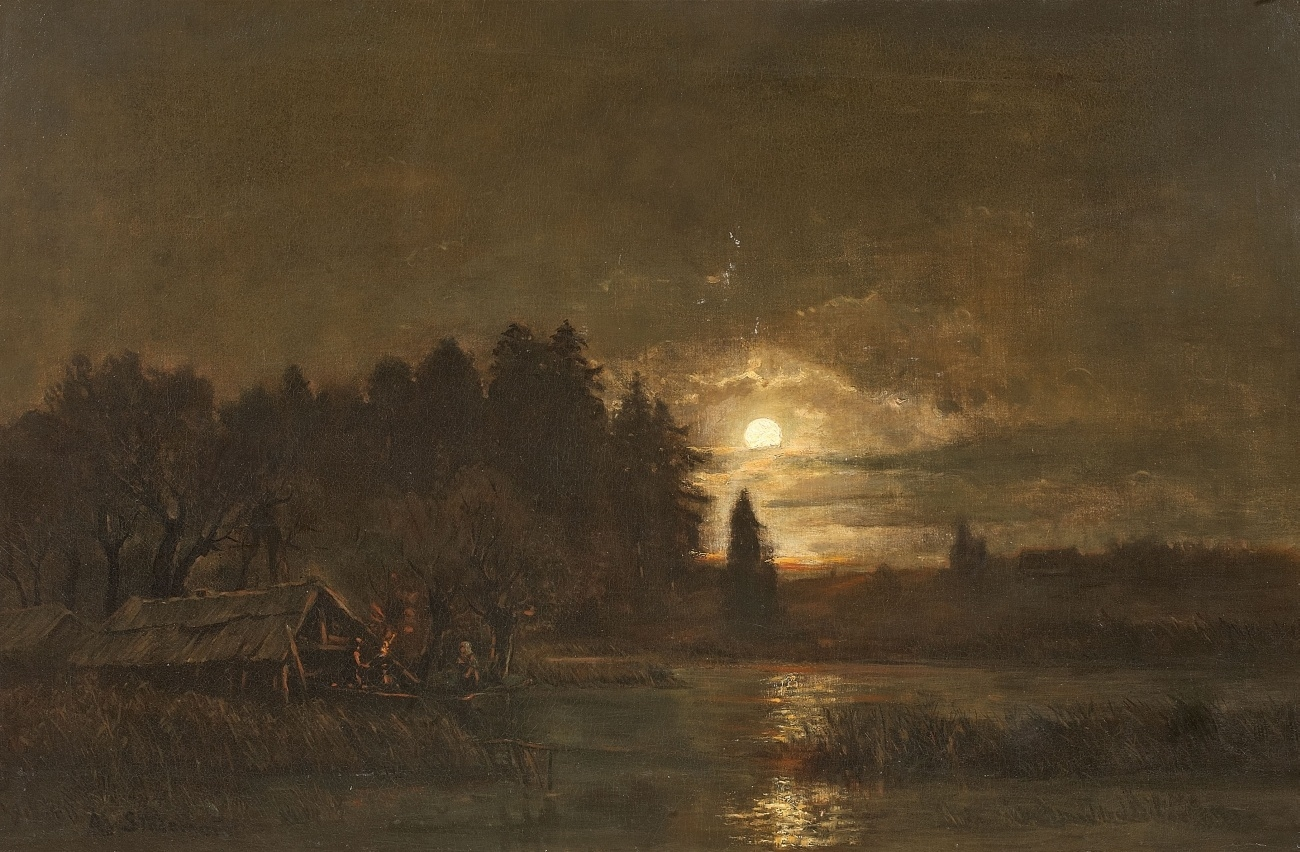
Night in art

Evening can begin before sunset and overlaps both twilight and night. Evening begins around 5 or 6 pm, or when the sun sets, and ends when one goes to bed.

=== Night ===
Night or nighttime is the period in which the sky is dark; the period between dusk and dawn when no light from the sun is visible. Light pollution during night can impact human and animal life, for example by disrupting sleep.

=== In other cultures ===
Divisions of the day into parts vary between cultures. For example, in Brazil the day is divided into four periods of six hours each: madrugada from midnight to 6:00 am, manhã from 6:00 am to noon, tarde from noon to 6:00 pm and noite from 6:00 pm to midnight.

== See also ==
- Determination of the day of the week
- Holiday
- ISO 8601
- Season, for a discussion of daylight and darkness at various latitudes
- Synodic day
- World Meteorological day
