= Geographical pole =

Points on a rotating astronomical body where the axis of rotation intersects the surface

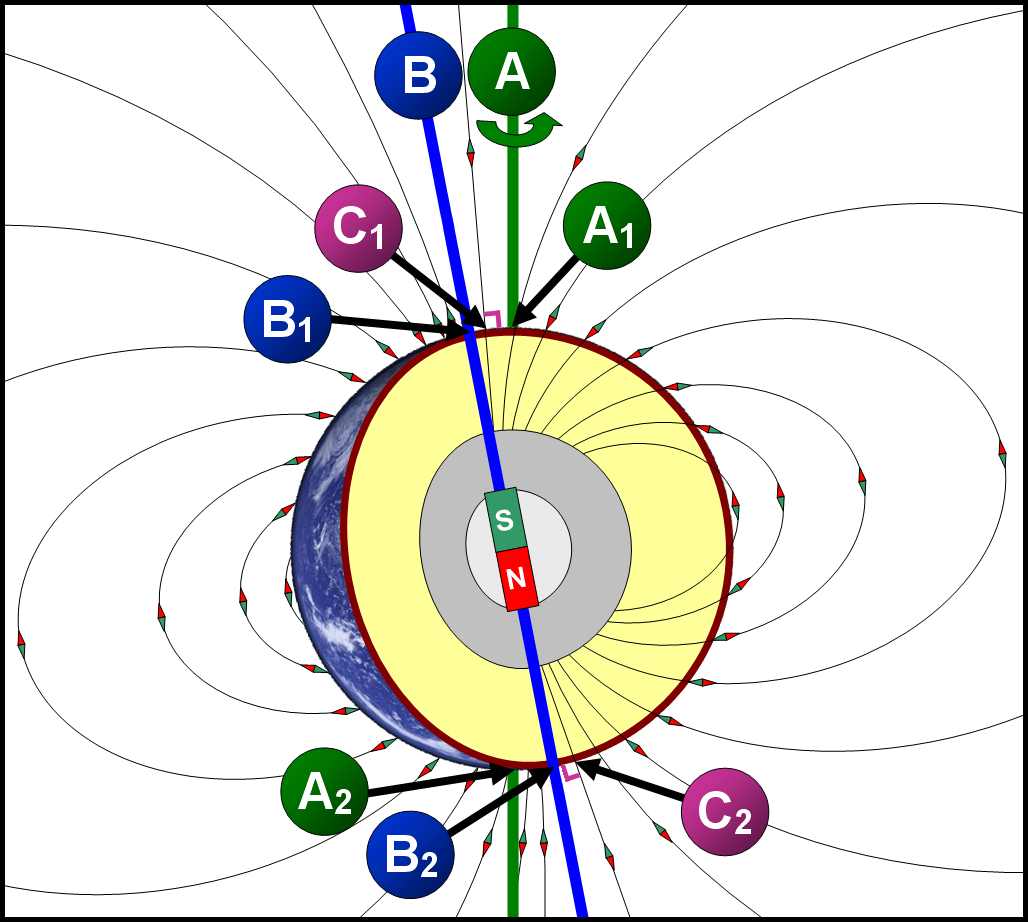
A geographical axis of rotation A (green), and showing the north geographical pole A1, and south geographical pole A2; also showing a magnetic field and the magnetic axis of rotation B (blue), and the north magnetic pole B1, and south magnetic pole B2.

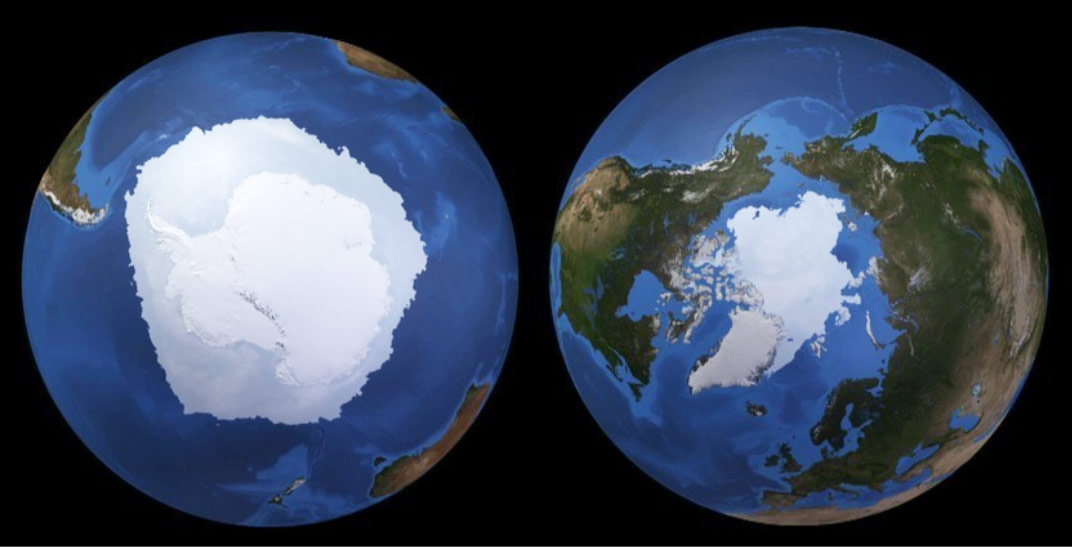
Visual comparison of Earth's polar regions

A geographical pole or geographic pole is either of the two points on Earth where its axis of rotation intersects its surface. The North Pole lies in the Arctic Ocean while the South Pole is in Antarctica. North and South poles are also defined for other planets or satellites in the Solar System, with a North pole being on the same side of the invariable plane as Earth's North pole.

Relative to Earth's surface, the geographic poles move by a few metres over periods of a few years. This is a combination of Chandler wobble, a free oscillation with a period of about 433 days; an annual motion responding to seasonal movements of air and water masses; and an irregular drift towards the 80th west meridian. As cartography and geodesy require exact and unchanging coordinates, the average or nominal locations of geographical poles are taken as fixed cartographic poles or geodetic poles, the points where the body's great circles of longitude intersect; in practice this is achieved by keeping latitude values of survey markers fixed and accounting for time variations in terms of Earth orientation parameters.

== See also ==
- Earth's rotation
- Polar motion
- Poles of astronomical bodies
- True polar wander
