= Gaithersburg Latitude Observatory =

Historic district in Maryland, United States

- U.S. National Register of Historic Places
- U.S. National Historic Landmark
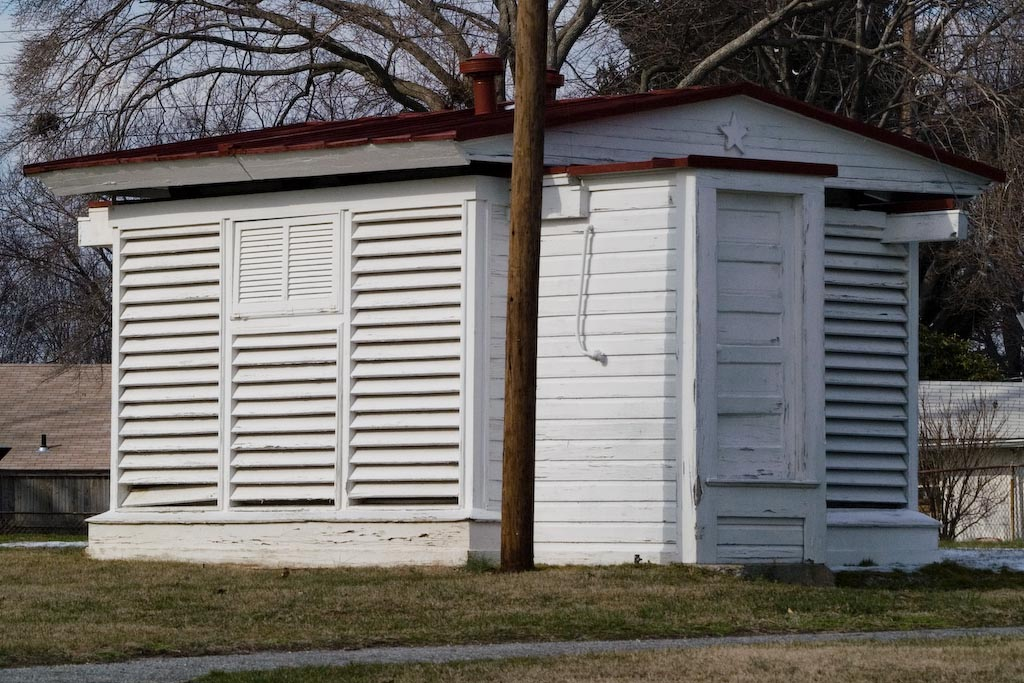
- Gaithersburg latitude observatory

- Location within Maryland Location within the United States
- Location: DeSellum Ave., Gaithersburg, Maryland
- Coordinates: 39°8′12″N 77°11′57″W
- Area: 2.3 acres (0.93 ha)
- Built: 1899
- Built by: Smith, Edwin
- NRHP reference No.: 85001578

Significant dates
- Added to NRHP: July 12, 1985
- Designated NHL: December 20, 1989

The Gaithersburg Latitude Observatory is a historic astronomical observatory on DeSellum Avenue in Gaithersburg, Maryland. It was established in 1899 as part of a system of six International Latitude Observatories to precisely measure the wobble of the Earth's rotating axis. The observatory building and adjacent monuments were designated a National Historic Landmark in 1989 as a testament to international scientific cooperation. The observatory was taken out of service in 1982 after automation eliminated the need for human observations; the property is now owned by the city.

== History ==
The Gaithersburg Latitude Observatory was one of six observatories — and one of the four original observatories built by 1899 — tracking the degree of "wobble" occurring on the earth's north-south axis and resultant variation of latitude. The Observatory — along with observatories in Cincinnati, Ohio; Ukiah, California; Mizusawa, Japan; Charjui in Russian Turkestan; and Carloforte, Sardina, Italy — performed in concert to carry out a coordinated program of star observation designed to investigate and calculate the degree of earth "wobble" or latitude variation.

On the grounds of the Gaithersburg Latitude Observatory stands a plaque that reads:

This small framed structure played a key role in the scientific investigation of the Earth's rotation. In 1898, the International Geodetic Association established a network of observatories to measure the wobble of the planet on its axis by plotting the locations of specific stars. This hilltop in Gaithersburg was chosen together with sites in California, Italy, Japan, and the Soviet Union. All five lay along the same latitude (39° 8' N). The American Stations were supervised by the United States Coast and Geodetic Survey. The observatory's roof was designed to part in the middle on two sets of tracks to expose the reflecting telescope inside to the night sky. Its slatted exterior walls stabilize the inside air to limit the effects of the temperatures on the accuracy of the telescope. The building's white paint minimizes heat retention that creates air turbulence around the telescope at night, distorting the stars. Knowledge gained from the observations recorded here nightly until 1982 assisted scientists in the study of the Earth's geophysical make-up and aided spacecraft orbiting the planet and navigating the universe.

A second portion of the observatory was constructed to house the Photographic Zenith Tube. The observers used the Photographic Zenith Tube to capture picture data using the Zenith telescope as a guide of alignment and star track. However, nothing now remains of this addition to the Gaithersburg Latitude Observatory.

== History ==
The Gaithersburg observatory was established as part of the International Polar Motion Service in 1899. The Gaithersburg observatory was built by Edwin Smith, chief of the Instrument Division of the U.S. Coast and Geodetic Survey, who had conducted similar measurements as a volunteer in 1891-92 from his home in Rockville, Maryland. During its operation twelve groups of stars were studied in the program, each group containing six pairs of stars. Each night, the station observed two of the star groups along a preset schedule and later compared the data against the measurements taken by the five sister stations. The station operated on this schedule until 1915, when it was temporarily closed as a result of economy measures. Operations resumed in 1932 and continued until 1982 when advances in computer technology and satellite observations rendered it obsolete, although data collected by the observatory over the years still has use to scientists, and has been applied to studies of polar motion, the physical properties of the Earth, climatology and satellite tracking and navigation.

== Description ==
The Gaithersburg Latitude Observatory stands on the north side of DeSellum Avenue, just north of the Gaithersburg High School campus. The building measures 13 feet (4.0 m) square with a small gable-roofed louvered entrance porch on the west side. There is a small shed-roofed addition on the east side. The structure rests on a mortar and fieldstone foundation. Each gable features a decorative wood five-pointed star. A metal ventilator is mounted over each half-section's roof, topped with similar metal star. A system of metal-capped wood rails allows the building to be pulled apart in the middle using ropes and pulleys. The halves operate independently. The structure is double-walled, with an inner frame of 4×4s sheathed with tongue-and-groove boards, separated by 9 inches (23 cm) from the outer, louvered wall, also framed with 4×4s.

On the interior, a double floor surrounds a pyramidal concrete pier that supported the observing instruments. A 1½ story brick caretaker's house, built in 1947, is located 70 feet (21 m) to the south; it is excluded from the landmark designation.

The site was extensively surveyed and documented to support its mission. The Meridian Mark Pier, about 200 feet (61 m) to the south, was used to align the zenith telescope. Five United States Coast and Geodetic Survey monuments are on the property. The RM-1 monument has been used by the National Oceanic and Atmospheric Administration for testing associated with the Global Positioning Satellite system.

== See also ==
- List of astronomical observatories
- List of National Historic Landmarks in Maryland
- National Register of Historic Places listings in Montgomery County, Maryland
