= Conventional International Origin =

Reference axis of the pole's average location on the Earth's surface over the year 1900

Conventional International Origin (CIO) is a conventionally defined reference axis of the pole's average location on the Earth's surface over the year 1900–1905.

Polar motion is the movement of Earth's rotation axis across its surface. The axis of the Earth's rotation tends, as the axis of a gyroscope, to maintain its orientation to inertial space. The Conventional International Origin is used to measure this movement.
