= Merri Sue Carter =

American astronomer

Merri Sue Carter (born 1964) is an American astronomer who works at the United States Naval Observatory as director of the World Data Center for the Rotation of the Earth, Washington. She is also the author of books on the history of astronomy with her father, geodesist William E. Carter.

== Education and career ==
Carter was born on November 16, 1964, in Columbus, Ohio, where her father, William E. Carter, was studying geodesy at Ohio State University. He became a research geodesist for the United States Air Force, the University of Hawaii, and the National Oceanic and Atmospheric Administration, and the family moved frequently as Carter was growing up.

She graduated from University of Maryland, College Park in 1986, and earned a master's degree in 1999 through University of Maryland University College. She has been an astronomer at the United States Naval Observatory since 1986. There, she directs the World Data Center for the Rotation of the Earth, Washington, which coordinates data for the International Earth Rotation and Reference Systems Service.

== Books ==
With her father, Carter is the author of:

- Latitude: How American Astronomers Solved the Mystery of Variation (Naval Institute Press, 2002), on the Chandler wobble
- Simon Newcomb: America's Unofficial Astronomer Royal (Mantanzas Publishing, 2006), a biography of Simon Newcomb
