= Polar motion =

Motion of Earth's rotational axis relative to its crust

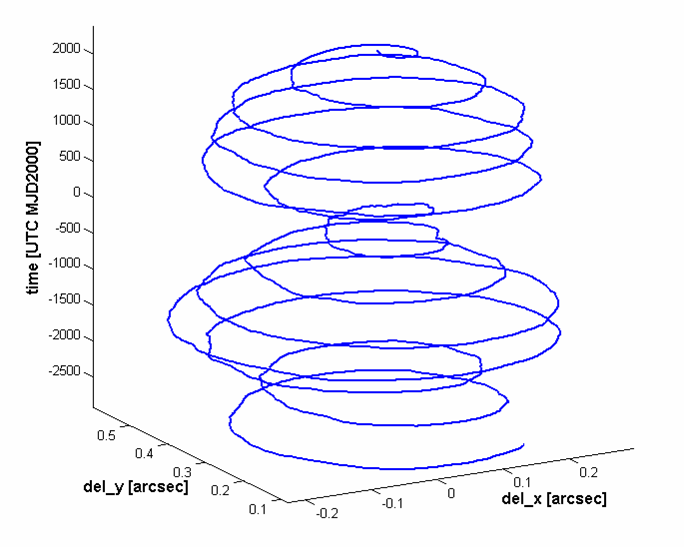
Polar motion in arc-seconds as function of time in days (0.1 arcsec ≈ 3 meters).

Polar motion of the Earth is the motion of the Earth's rotational axis relative to its crust. This is measured with respect to a reference frame in which the solid Earth is fixed (a so-called Earth-centered, Earth-fixed or ECEF reference frame). This variation is a few meters on the surface of the Earth.

== Analysis ==
Polar motion is defined relative to a conventionally defined reference axis, the CIO (Conventional International Origin), being the pole's average location over the year 1900. It consists of three major components: a free oscillation called Chandler wobble with a period of about 435 days, an annual oscillation, and an irregular drift in the direction of the 80th meridian west, which has lately been less extremely west.

== Causes ==
The slow drift, about 20 m since 1900, is partly due to motions in the Earth's core and mantle, and partly to the redistribution of water mass as the Greenland ice sheet melts, and to isostatic rebound, i.e. the slow rise of land that was formerly burdened with ice sheets or glaciers. The drift is roughly along the 80th meridian west. Since about 2000, the pole has found a less extreme drift, which is roughly along the central meridian. This less dramatically westward drift of motion is attributed to the global scale mass transport between the oceans and the continents.

Major earthquakes cause abrupt polar motion by altering the volume distribution of the Earth's solid mass. These shifts are quite small in magnitude relative to the long-term core/mantle and isostatic rebound components of polar motion.

== Principle ==
In the absence of external torques, the vector of the angular momentum M of a rotating system remains constant and is directed toward a fixed point in space. If the earth were perfectly symmetrical and rigid, M would remain aligned with its axis of symmetry, which would also be its axis of rotation. In the case of the Earth, it is almost identical with its axis of rotation, with the discrepancy due to shifts of mass on the planet's surface. The vector of the figure axis F of the system (or maximum principal axis, the axis which yields the largest value of moment of inertia) wobbles around M. This motion is called Euler's free nutation. For a rigid Earth which is an oblate spheroid to a good approximation, the figure axis F would be its geometric axis defined by the geographic north and south pole, and identical with the axis of its polar moment of inertia. The Euler period of free nutation is

(1) τ_{E} = 1/ν_{E} = A/(C − A) sidereal days ≈ 307 sidereal days ≈ 0.84 sidereal years

ν_{E} = 1.19 is the normalized Euler frequency (in units of reciprocal years), C = 8.04 × 10^{37} kg m^{2} is the polar moment of inertia of the Earth, A is its mean equatorial moment of inertia, and C − A = 2.61 × 10^{35} kg m^{2}.

The observed angle between the figure axis of the Earth F and its angular momentum M is a few hundred milliarcseconds (mas). This rotation can be interpreted as a linear displacement of either geographical pole amounting to several meters on the surface of the Earth: 100 mas subtends an arc length of 3.082 m, when converted to radians and multiplied by the Earth's polar radius (6,356,752.3 m). Using the geometric axis as the primary axis of a new body-fixed coordinate system, one arrives at the Euler equation of a gyroscope describing the apparent motion of the rotation axis about the geometric axis of the Earth. This is the so-called polar motion.

Observations show that the figure axis exhibits an annual wobble forced by surface mass displacement via atmospheric and/or ocean dynamics, while the free nutation is much larger than the Euler period and of the order of 435 to 445 sidereal days. This observed free nutation is called Chandler wobble. There exist, in addition, polar motions with smaller periods of the order of decades. Finally, a secular polar drift of about 0.10 m per year in the direction of 80° west has been observed which is due to mass redistribution within the Earth's interior by continental drift, and/or slow motions within mantle and core which gives rise to changes of the moment of inertia.

The annual variation was discovered by Karl Friedrich Küstner in 1885 by exact measurements of the variation of the latitude of stars, while S.C. Chandler found the free nutation in 1891. Both periods superpose, giving rise to a beat frequency with a period of about 5 to 8 years (see Figure 1).

This polar motion should not be confused with the changing direction of the Earth's rotation axis relative to the stars with different periods, caused mostly by the torques on the Geoid due to the gravitational attraction of the Moon and Sun. They are also called nutations, except for the slowest, which is the precession of the equinoxes.

== Observations ==
Polar motion is observed routinely by space geodesy methods such as very-long-baseline interferometry, lunar laser ranging and satellite laser ranging. The annual component is rather constant in amplitude, and its frequency varies by not more than 1 to 2%. The amplitude of the Chandler wobble, however, varies by a factor of three, and its frequency by up to 7%. Its maximum amplitude during the last 100 years never exceeded 230 mas.

The Chandler wobble is usually considered a resonance phenomenon, a free nutation that is excited by a source and then dies away with a time constant τ_{D} of the order of 100 years. It is a measure of the elastic reaction of the Earth. It is also the explanation for the deviation of the Chandler period from the Euler period. However, rather than dying away, the Chandler wobble, continuously observed for more than 100 years, varies in amplitude and shows a sometimes rapid frequency shift within a few years. This reciprocal behavior between amplitude and frequency has been described by the empirical formula:

(2) m = 3.7/(ν − 0.816) (for 0.83 < ν < 0.9)

with m the observed amplitude (in units of mas), and ν the frequency (in units of reciprocal sidereal years) of the Chandler wobble. In order to generate the Chandler wobble, recurring excitation is necessary. Seismic activity, groundwater movement, snow load, or atmospheric interannual dynamics have been suggested as such recurring forces, e.g. Atmospheric excitation seems to be the most likely candidate. Others propose a combination of atmospheric and oceanic processes, with the dominant excitation mechanism being ocean‐bottom pressure fluctuations.

Current and historic polar motion data is available from the International Earth Rotation and Reference Systems Service's Earth orientation parameters. Note in using this data that the convention is to define p_{x} to be positive along 0° longitude and p_{y} to be positive along 90°E longitude.

== Theory ==
=== Annual component ===
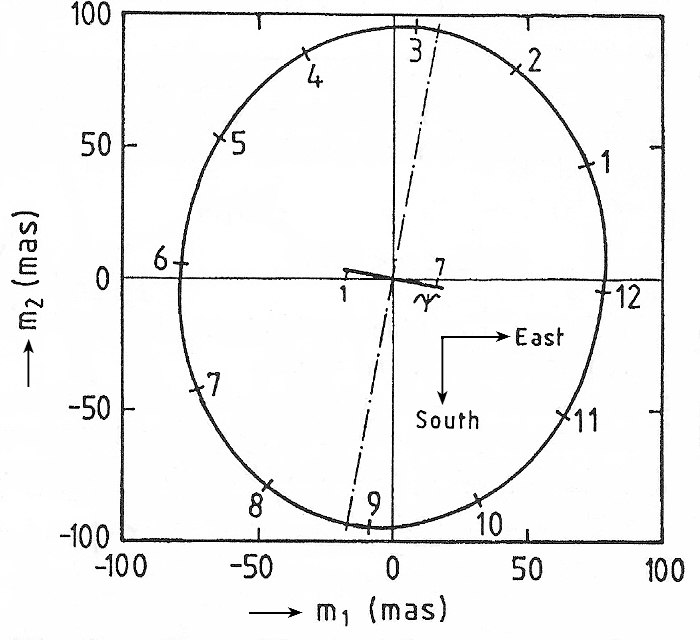
Figure 2. Rotation vector m of the annual component of polar motion as function of year. Numbers and tick marks indicate the beginning of each calendar month. The dash-dotted line is in the direction of the major axis. The line in the direction of the minor axis is the location of the excitation function vs. time of year. (100 mas (milliarcseconds) = 3.082 m on the Earth's surface at the poles)

There is now general agreement that the annual component of polar motion is a forced motion excited predominantly by atmospheric dynamics. There exist two external forces to excite polar motion: atmospheric winds, and pressure loading. The main component is pressure forcing, which is a standing wave of the form:

(3) p = p_{0}Θ^{1}_{−3}(θ) cos[2πν_{A}(t − t_{0})] cos(λ − λ_{0})

with p_{0} a pressure amplitude, Θ^{1}_{−3} a Hough function describing the latitude distribution of the atmospheric pressure on the ground, θ the geographic co-latitude, t the time of year, t_{0} a time delay, ν_{A} = 1.003 the normalized frequency of one solar year, λ the longitude, and λ_{0} the longitude of maximum pressure. The Hough function in a first approximation is proportional to sin θ cos θ. Such standing wave represents the seasonally varying spatial difference of the Earth's surface pressure. In northern winter, there is a pressure high over the North Atlantic Ocean and a pressure low over Siberia with temperature differences of the order of 50°, and vice versa in summer, thus an unbalanced mass distribution on the surface of the Earth. The position of the vector m of the annual component describes an ellipse (Figure 2). The calculated ratio between major and minor axis of the ellipse is

(4) m_{1}/m_{2} = ν_{C}

where ν_{C} is the Chandler resonance frequency. The result is in good agreement with the observations.

From Figure 2 together with eq.(4), one obtains ν_{C} = 0.83, corresponding to a Chandler resonance period of

(5) τ_{C} = 441 sidereal days = 1.20 sidereal years

p_{0} = 2.2 hPa, λ_{0} = −170° the latitude of maximum pressure, and t_{0} = −0.07 years = −25 days.

It is difficult to estimate the effect of the ocean, which may slightly increase the value of maximum ground pressure necessary to generate the annual wobble. This ocean effect has been estimated to be of the order of 5–10%.

=== Chandler wobble ===
It is improbable that the internal parameters of the Earth responsible for the Chandler wobble would be time dependent on such short time intervals. Moreover, the observed stability of the annual component argues against any hypothesis of a variable Chandler resonance frequency. One possible explanation for the observed frequency-amplitude behavior would be a forced, but slowly changing quasi-periodic excitation by interannually varying atmospheric dynamics. Indeed, a quasi-14 month period has been found in coupled ocean-atmosphere general circulation models, and a regional 14-month signal in regional sea surface temperature has been observed.

To describe such behavior theoretically, one starts with the Euler equation with pressure loading as in eq.(3), however now with a slowly changing frequency ν, and replaces the frequency ν by a complex frequency ν + iν_{D}, where ν_{D} simulates dissipation due to the elastic reaction of the Earth's interior. As in Figure 2, the result is the sum of a prograde and a retrograde circular polarized wave. For frequencies ν < 0.9 the retrograde wave can be neglected, and there remains the circular propagating prograde wave where the vector of polar motion moves on a circle in anti-clockwise direction. The magnitude of m becomes:

(6) m = 14.5 p_{0} ν_{C}/[(ν − ν_{C})^{2} + ν_{D}^{2}]^{1/2} (for ν < 0.9)

It is a resonance curve which can be approximated at its flanks by

(7) m ≈ 14.5 p_{0} ν_{C}/|ν − ν_{C}| (for (ν − ν_{C})^{2} ≫ ν_{D}^{2})

The maximum amplitude of m at ν = ν_{C} becomes

(8) m_{max} = 14.5 p_{0} ν_{C}/ν_{D}

In the range of validity of the empirical formula eq.(2), there is reasonable agreement with eq.(7). From eqs.(2) and (7), one finds the number p_{0} ∼ 0.2 hPa. The observed maximum value of m yields m_{max} ≥ 230 mas. Together with eq.(8), one obtains

(9) τ_{D} = 1/ν_{D} ≥ 100 years

The number of the maximum pressure amplitude is tiny, indeed. It clearly indicates the resonance amplification of Chandler wobble in the environment of the Chandler resonance frequency.

== See also ==
- Geodesy
- International Polar Motion Service
- Pole shift hypothesis
- Pole tide
- True polar wander
