= Nychthemeron =

Period of 24 consecutive hours

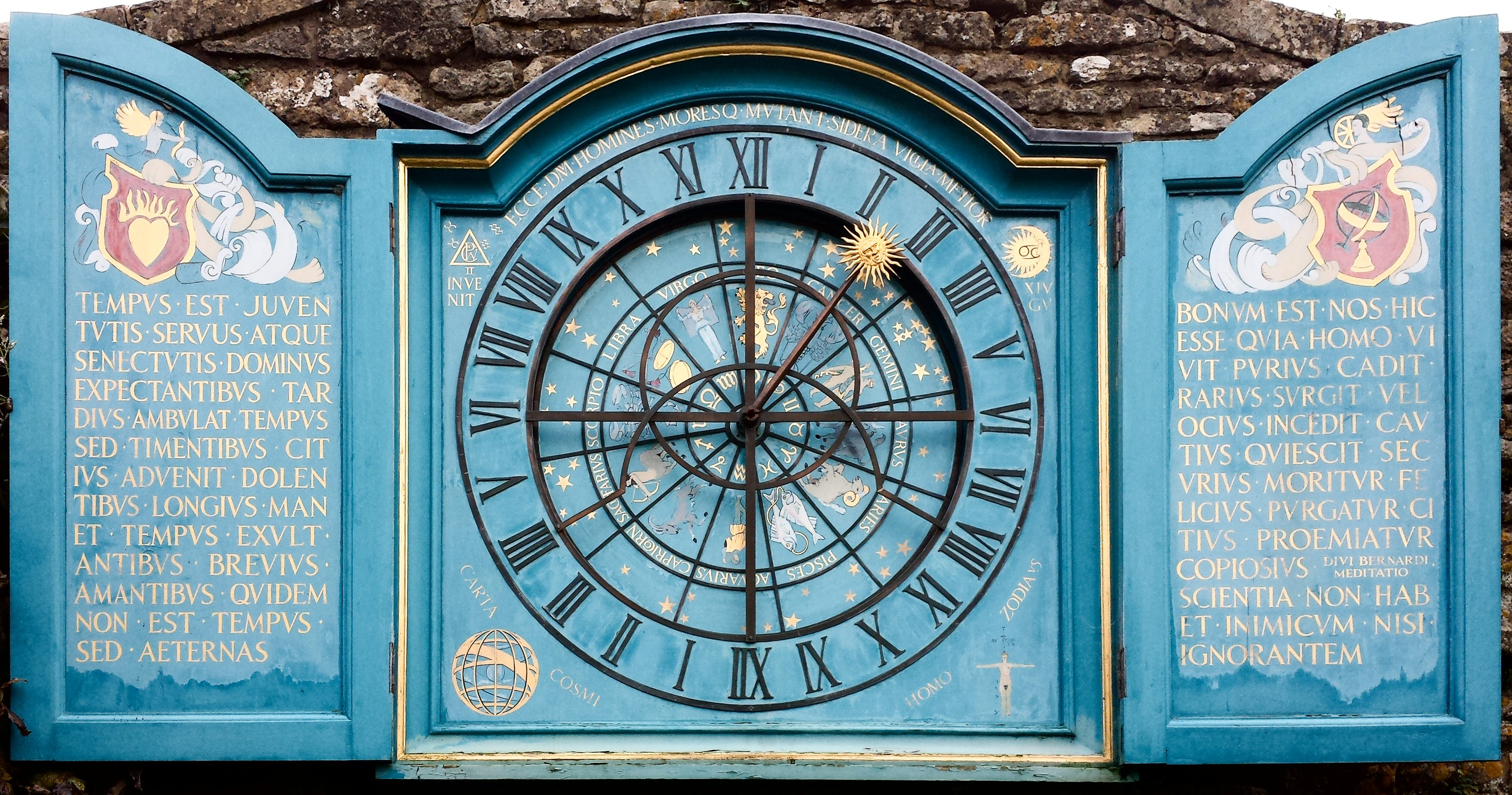
The Nychthemeron Clock in Snowshill Manor, Gloucestershire, UK

Nychthemeron /nɪkˈθɛmərɒn/, occasionally nycthemeron or nuchthemeron, is a period of 24 consecutive hours. It is sometimes used, especially in technical literature, to avoid the ambiguity inherent in the term day.

It is the period of time that a calendar normally labels with a date, although a nychthemeron simply designates a time-span that can start at any time, not just midnight.

== Etymology ==
It is a loanword from Ancient Greek νυχθήμερον (nukhthḗmeron), which appears in the New Testament. This is a noun use of the neuter singular form of Ancient Greek: νυχθήμερος, romanized: nukhthḗmeros, lit. 'lasting a day and night', from νύξ (núx, “night”) + ἡμέρα (hēméra, “day”).
