= Seth Carlo Chandler =

American astronomer (1846–1913)

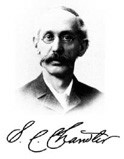
- Born: September 16, 1846; Boston, Massachusetts, US
- Died: December 31, 1913 (aged 67); Wellesley, Massachusetts, US
- Known for: Chandler wobble
- Awards: Gold Medal of the Royal Astronomical Society in 1896; James Craig Watson Medal in 1894
- Scientific career
- Fields: astronomy

Seth Carlo Chandler, Jr. (September 16, 1846 – December 31, 1913) was an American astronomer, geodesist, and actuary.

He was born in Boston, Massachusetts, to Seth Carlo and Mary (née Cheever) Chandler. During his last year in high school he performed mathematical computations for Benjamin Peirce, of the Harvard College Observatory.

After graduating, he became the assistant of Benjamin A. Gould. Gould was director of the Longitude Department of the United States Coast Survey, a United States Government agency responsible for geodetic surveys. When Gould left to become director of the national observatory in Argentina, Chandler also left and became an actuary. However, he continued to work in astronomy as an amateur affiliated with Harvard College Observatory.

Chandler married Caroline Margaret Herman on October 20, 1870. They were married for 47 years and had several daughters together. Chandler died on December 31, 1913, in Wellesley, Massachusetts.

Chandler is best remembered for his research on what is today known as the Chandler wobble. His research on polar motion spanned nearly three decades.

Chandler also made contributions to other areas of astronomy, including variable stars. He independently co-discovered the nova T Coronae Borealis, improved the estimate of the constant of aberration, and computed the orbital parameters of asteroids and comets.

Chandler was awarded the Gold Medal of the Royal Astronomical Society in 1896 and the James Craig Watson Medal in 1894.

The crater Chandler on the Moon is named after him.

== Bibliography ==
- "Latitude, How American Astronomers Solved the Mystery of Variation" by Bill Carter and Merri Sue Carter, Naval Institute Press, Annapolis, MD., 2002.
- Carter, W. E.; Carter, M. S. (December 31, 1913). Seth Carlo Chandler, Jr. 1846—1913. A Biographical Memoir. The National Academies Press. doi:10.17226/4961. ISBN 978-0-309-05237-5.
