= Diurnal cycle =

Pattern with a period of one day

Earth's rotation relative to the Sun causes the 24-hour day/night cycle.

A diurnal cycle (or diel cycle) is any pattern that recurs every 24 hours as a result of one full rotation of the planet Earth around its axis. Earth's rotation causes surface temperature fluctuations throughout the day and night, as well as weather changes throughout the year. The diurnal cycle also has important effects on the biological level such as changes in photosynthesis. Due to the rotation, the diurnal cycles temperatures depend mainly on incoming solar radiation.

== Climate and atmosphere ==
Diurnal variation of air temperature (blue) lag by 3 to 4 hours behind insolation at solar noon (red).

In climatology, the diurnal cycle is one of the most basic forms of climate patterns, including variations in diurnal temperature and rainfall. Diurnal cycles may be approximately sinusoidal or include components of a truncated sinusoid (due to the Sun's rising and setting) and thermal relaxation (Newton cooling) at night. The diurnal cycle also has a great impact on carbon dioxide levels in the atmosphere, due to processes such as photosynthesis and cellular respiration. In addition, Carbon dioxide levels vary more in growing seasons due to the earths axial tilt causing more sunlight on higher latitudes which causes more photosynthesis.

== Biological effects ==
Diurnal cycles of light and temperature can result in similar cycles in biological processes, such as photosynthesis in plants and clinical depression in humans. Plant responses to environmental cycles may even induce indirect cycles in rhizosphere microbial activities, including nitrogen fixation. While for humans, Hormones such as cortisol and cortisone vary throughout the day which can impact stress levels. The diurnal cycle goes past the environmental processes.

== Semi-diurnal cycle ==
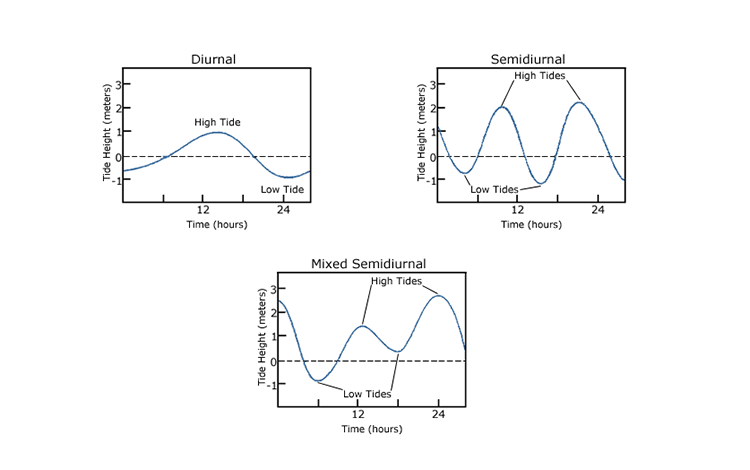
There are typically three different types of tides: diurnal, which has one high tide and one low tide each day; semi-diurnal, which has two high tides and two low tides each day; and mixed, which has two high tides and two low tides each day with varying heights.

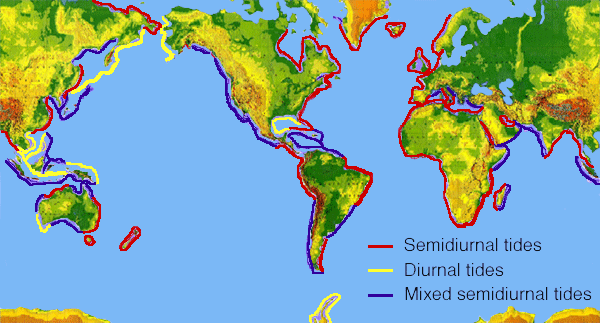
Map of areas with the different tidal cycles.

A semi-diurnal cycle refers to a pattern that occurs about every twelve hours or about twice a day. Often these can be related to lunar tides, in which case the interval is closer to 12 hours and 25 minutes. These lunar tides happen close to two times per day and affects water levels, water movement and coastal sedimentation with sedimentation being accumulated during every semi diurnal cycle. The lunar tide or semidiurnal tide occurs often in the Americas and in the Atlantic ocean.

== See also ==
- Chronotype
- Circadian rhythm
- Diel vertical migration
- Diurnality
- Diurnal climate
