= Chandler wobble =

Small deviation in the Earth's axis of rotation relative to the solid earth

The Chandler wobble or Chandler variation of latitude is a small deviation in the Earth's axis of rotation relative to the solid earth, which was discovered by and named after American astronomer Seth Carlo Chandler in 1891. It amounts to change of about 9 metres (30 ft) in the point at which the axis intersects the Earth's surface and has a period of 433 days. This wobble, which is an astronomical nutation, combines with another wobble with a period of six years, so that the total polar motion varies with a period of about 7 years.

The Chandler wobble is an example of a free nutation; motion that can occur for a freely rotating object that is not a sphere. The Chandler wobble is distinct from motion of the direction of the Earth's rotation axis relative to the stars also varies with different periods, and these motions—caused by the tidal forces of the Moon and Sun—are also called nutations, except for the slowest, which are precessions of the equinoxes.

== Predictions ==
The existence of Earth's free nutation was predicted by Isaac Newton in Corollaries 20 to 22 of Proposition 66, Book 1 of the Philosophiæ Naturalis Principia Mathematica, and by Leonhard Euler in 1765 as part of his studies of the dynamics of rotating bodies. Based on the known ellipticity of the Earth, Euler predicted that it would have a period of 305 days. Several astronomers searched for motions with this period, but none was found. Chandler's contribution was to look for motions at any possible period; once the Chandler wobble was observed, the difference between its period and the one predicted by Euler was explained by Simon Newcomb as being caused by the non-rigidity of the Earth. The full explanation for the period also involves the fluid nature of the Earth's core and oceans—the wobble, in fact, produces a very small ocean tide with an amplitude of approximately 6 mm (1/4 in), called a pole tide, which is the only tide not caused by an extraterrestrial body. Despite the small amplitude, the gravitational effect of the pole tide is easily detected by the superconducting gravimeter.

== Measurement ==
The International Latitude Observatories were established in 1899 to measure the wobble as observed in latitude determinations. These provided data on the Chandler and annual wobble for most of the 20th century, though they were eventually superseded by other methods of measurement. Monitoring of the polar motion is now done by the International Earth Rotation Service (IERS).

The wobble's amplitude has varied since its discovery, reaching its largest size in 1910 and fluctuating noticeably from one decade to another. In 2009, Malkin & Miller's analysis of IERS Pole coordinates time series data from January 1946 to January 2009 showed three phase reversals of the wobble, in 1850, 1920, and 2005.

Measurements indicate the Chandler wobble has greatly diminished post-2015.

== Hypotheses ==
Since the Earth is not a rigid body, the Chandler wobble should die down with a time constant of about 68 years, a very short period compared to geological timescales. (This is related to the Q factor of the oscillation.) The processes that continually re-excite the wobble are of interest to geophysicists. While it must be due to changes in the mass distribution or angular momentum of the Earth's outer core, atmosphere, oceans, or crust (from earthquakes), for a long time the actual source was unclear, since no available motions seemed to be coherent with what was driving the wobble.

An investigation was done in 2001 by Richard Gross at the Jet Propulsion Laboratory managed by the California Institute of Technology. He used angular momentum models of the atmosphere and the oceans in computer simulations to show that from 1985 to 1996, the Chandler wobble was excited by a combination of atmospheric and oceanic processes, with the dominant excitation mechanism being ocean-bottom pressure fluctuations. Gross found that two-thirds of the "wobble" was caused by fluctuating pressure on the seabed, which, in turn, is caused by changes in the circulation of the oceans caused by variations in temperature, salinity, and wind. The remaining third is due to atmospheric pressure fluctuations.

== Chandler wobble of Mars ==
Using 18 years of radio tracking observations of the Mars Odyssey, Mars Reconnaissance Orbiter and the Mars Global Surveyor spacecraft, the Chandler wobble of Mars has been detected. It is the first time it has been detected on a planetary body other than the Earth. The amplitude is 10 cm, the period is 206.9 ± 0.5 days, and it is in a nearly circular counterclockwise direction as viewed from the North Pole.

== See also ==
- Milankovitch cycles
- United States Naval Observatory
