= Day length fluctuations =

Short-term changes in the length of the day

The length of the day (LOD), which has increased over the long term of Earth's history due to tidal effects, is also subject to fluctuations on a shorter scale of time. Exact measurements of time by atomic clocks and satellite laser ranging have revealed that the LOD is subject to a number of different changes. These subtle variations have periods that range from a few weeks to a few years. They are attributed to interactions between the dynamic atmosphere and Earth itself. The International Earth Rotation and Reference Systems Service (IERS) monitors the changes.

In the absence of external torques, the total angular momentum of Earth as a whole system must be constant. Internal torques are due to relative movements and mass redistribution of Earth's core, mantle, crust, oceans, atmosphere, and cryosphere. In order to keep the total angular momentum constant, a change of the angular momentum in one region must necessarily be balanced by angular momentum changes in the other regions.

Crustal movements (such as continental drift) or polar cap melting are slow secular (non-periodic) events. The characteristic coupling time between core and mantle has been estimated to be on the order of ten years, and the so-called 'decade fluctuations' of Earth's rotation rate are thought to result from fluctuations within the core, transferred to the mantle. The length of day (LOD) varies significantly even for time scales from a few years down to weeks (Figure), and the observed fluctuations in the LOD - after eliminating the effects of external torques - are a direct consequence of the action of internal torques. These short term fluctuations are very probably generated by the interaction between the solid Earth and the atmosphere.

The length of day of other planets also varies, particularly of the planet Venus, which has such a dynamic and massive atmosphere that its length of day fluctuates by up to 20 minutes.

== Observations ==
Deviation of day length from SI based day

Any change of the axial component of the atmospheric angular momentum (AAM) must be accompanied by a corresponding change of the angular momentum of Earth's crust and mantle (due to the law of conservation of angular momentum). Because the moment of inertia of the system mantle-crust is only slightly influenced by atmospheric pressure loading, this mainly requires a change in the angular velocity of the solid Earth; i.e., a change of LOD. The LOD can presently be measured to a high accuracy over integration times of only a few hours, and general circulation models of the atmosphere allow high precision determination of changes in AAM in the model. A comparison between AAM and LOD shows that they are highly correlated. In particular, one recognizes an annual period of LOD with an amplitude of 0.34 milliseconds, maximizing on February 3, and a semiannual period with an amplitude of 0.29 milliseconds, maximizing on May 8, as well as 10‑day fluctuations of the order of 0.1 milliseconds. Interseasonal fluctuations reflecting El Niño events and quasi-biennial oscillations have also been observed. There is now general agreement that most of the changes in LOD on time scales from weeks to a few years are excited by changes in AAM.

== Exchange of angular momentum ==
One means of exchange of angular momentum between the atmosphere and the non-gaseous parts of Earth is evaporation and precipitation. The water cycle moves massive quantities of water between the oceans and the atmosphere. As the mass of water (vapour) rises its rotation must slow due to conservation of angular momentum. Equally when it falls as rain, its rate of rotation will increase to conserve angular momentum. Any net global transfer of water mass from oceans to the atmosphere or the opposite implies a change in the speed of rotation of the solid/liquid Earth which will be reflected in LOD.

Observational evidence shows that there is no significant time delay between the change of AAM and its corresponding change of LOD for periods longer than about 10 days. This implies a strong coupling between atmosphere and solid Earth due to surface friction with a time constant of about 7 days, the spin-down time of the Ekman layer. This spin-down time is the characteristic time for the transfer of atmospheric axial angular momentum to Earth's surface and vice versa.

The zonal wind-component on the ground, which is most effective for the transfer of axial angular momentum between Earth and atmosphere, is the component describing rigid rotation of the atmosphere. The zonal wind of this component has the amplitude u at the equator relative to the ground, where u > 0 indicates superrotation and u < 0 indicates retrograde rotation with respect to the solid Earth. All other wind terms merely redistribute the AAM with latitude, an effect that cancels out when averaged over the globe.

Surface friction allows the atmosphere to 'pick up' angular momentum from Earth in the case of retrograde rotation or release it to Earth in the case of superrotation. Averaging over longer time scales, no exchange of AAM with the solid Earth takes place. Earth and atmosphere are decoupled. This implies that the ground level zonal wind-component responsible for rigid rotation must be zero on the average. Indeed, the observed meridional structure of the climatic mean zonal wind on the ground shows westerly winds (from the west) in middle latitudes beyond about ± 30^{o} latitude and easterly winds (from the east) in low latitudes—the trade winds—as well as near the poles (prevailing winds). The atmosphere picks up angular momentum from Earth at low and high latitudes and transfers the same amount to Earth at middle latitudes.

Any short term fluctuation of the rigidly rotating zonal wind-component is then accompanied by a corresponding change in LOD. In order to estimate the order of magnitude of that effect, one may consider the total atmosphere to rotate rigidly with velocity u (in m/s) without surface friction. Then this value is related to the corresponding change of the length of day Δτ (in milliseconds) as

$$u \approx 2.7 \Delta\tau.$$

The annual component of the change of the length of day of Δτ ≈ 0.34 ms corresponds then to a superrotation of u ≈ 0.9 m/s, and the semiannual component of Δτ ≈ 0.29 ms to u ≈ 0.8 m/s.

== See also ==
- Atmospheric super-rotation
