= Earth's rotation =

Rotation of Earth around its axis

Earth's rotation imaged by Deep Space Climate Observatory

Earth's rotation or Earth's spin is the rotation of planet Earth around its own axis, as well as changes in the orientation of the rotation axis in space. Earth rotates eastward, in prograde motion. As viewed from the northern polar star Polaris, Earth turns counterclockwise.

The North Pole, also called the Geographic North Pole or Terrestrial North Pole, is the point in the Northern Hemisphere at which Earth's axis of rotation meets its surface. This point is distinct from Earth's north magnetic pole. The South Pole is the other point at which Earth's axis of rotation intersects its surface, in Antarctica.

Earth rotates once in about 24 hours with respect to the Sun, but once every 23 hours, 56 minutes, and 4 seconds with respect to other distant stars (see below). Earth's rotation is slowing slightly with time; thus, a day was shorter in the past. This is due to the tidal effects the Moon has on Earth's rotation. Atomic clocks show that the modern day is longer by about 1.7 milliseconds per century compared to several centuries ago, slowly increasing the rate at which UTC diverges from UT1. Analysis of historical astronomical records shows a slowing trend; the length of a day has increased by about 2.3 milliseconds per century since the 8th century BCE.

Scientists reported that in 2020, Earth had begun to rotate faster, after consistently turning slower than 86,400 seconds per day in the decades before. On June 29, 2022, Earth's rotation was completed in 1.59 milliseconds under 24 hours, setting a new record. In 2026, leap seconds were abolished, in part to avoid risks associated with a contemplated "negative leap second" to account for the faster rotation.

This increase in speed is thought to be due to various factors, including the complex motion of its molten core, oceans, and atmosphere, the effect of celestial bodies such as the Moon, and possibly climate change, which is causing the ice at Earth's poles to melt. The masses of ice account for the Earth's shape being that of an oblate spheroid, bulging around the equator. When these masses are reduced, the poles rebound from the loss of weight, and Earth becomes more spherical, which has the effect of bringing mass closer to its centre of gravity. Conservation of angular momentum dictates that a mass distributed more closely around its centre of gravity spins faster.

Earth's rotational speed is about 1,674.7 km/h (1,040.6 mph; 465.2 m/s; 1,526.2 ft/s) at the equator, but it decreases with latitude, becoming zero at the poles. This is because Earth's circumference is greatest along the equator and the shortest through the poles. The speed at any given latitude can be calculated by multiplying the equatorial speed by the cosine of the latitude. At the equator, the speed is about 1,674.7 km/h (1,040.6 mph), calculated by dividing Earth's equatorial circumference (c. 40,075 km (24,901 mi)) by the length of a sidereal day (c. 23.93 hours). At middle latitudes, the speed decreases; for example, at 45° latitude, the speed is roughly 1,184.2 km/h (735.8 mph) (1674.7 × cos (45°)). At the poles, the speed is effectively zero, as no distance there covers in a full rotation.

== History ==
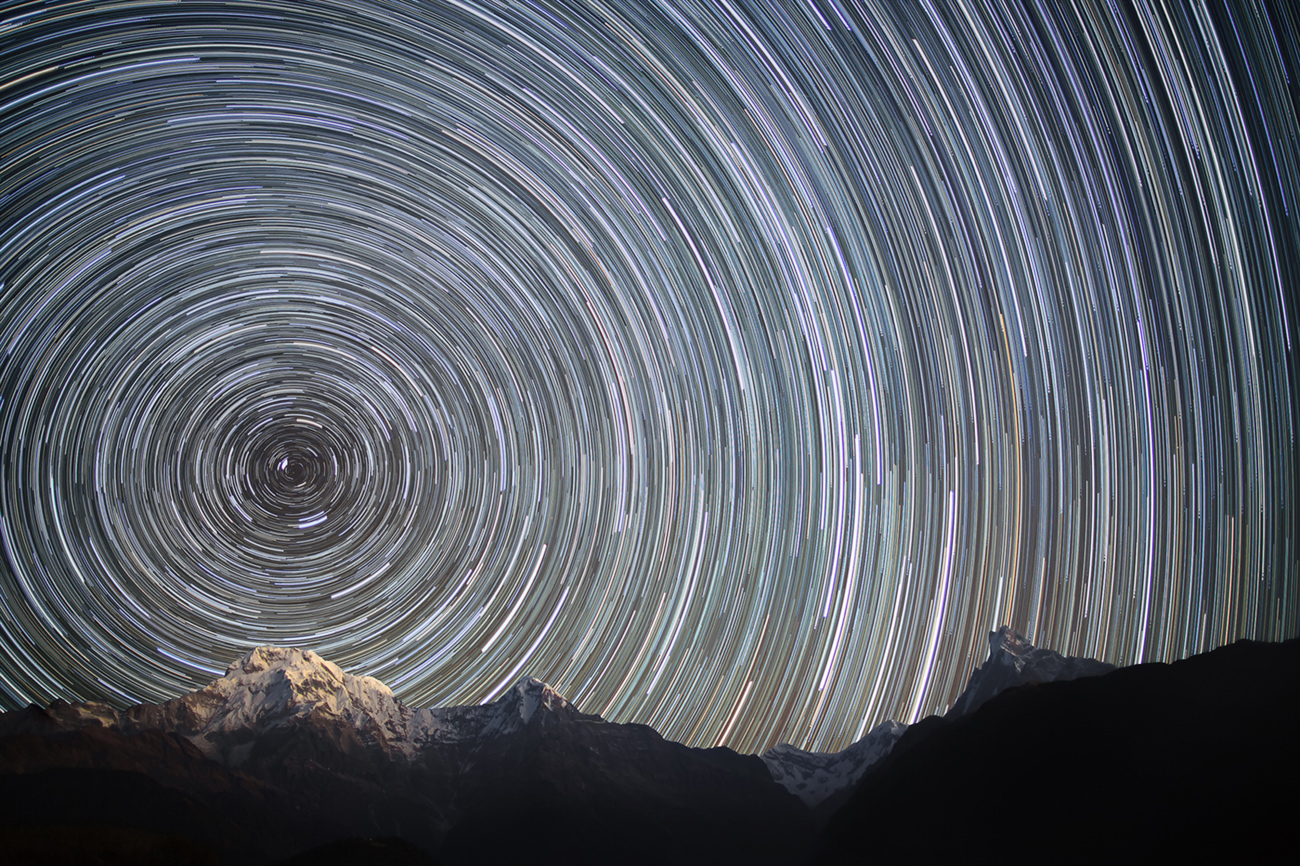
This long-exposure photo of the northern night sky above the Nepali Himalayas shows the apparent paths of the stars as Earth rotates.

Among the ancient Greeks, several of the Pythagorean school believed in the rotation of Earth rather than the apparent diurnal rotation of the heavens. Perhaps the first was Philolaus (470–385 BCE), though his system was complicated, including a counter-earth rotating daily about a central fire.

A more conventional picture was supported by Hicetas, Heraclides and Ecphantus in the fourth century BCE who assumed that Earth rotated but did not suggest that Earth revolved about the Sun. In the third century BCE, Aristarchus of Samos suggested the Sun's central place.

However, Aristotle in the fourth century BCE criticized the ideas of Philolaus as being based on theory rather than observation. He established the idea of a sphere of fixed stars that rotated about Earth. This was accepted by most of those who came after, in particular Claudius Ptolemy (2nd century CE), who thought Earth would be devastated by gales if it rotated.

In 499 CE, the Indian astronomer Aryabhata suggested that the spherical Earth rotates about its axis daily and that the apparent movement of the stars is a relative motion caused by the rotation of the Earth. He provided the following analogy: "Just as a man in a boat going in one direction sees the stationary things on the bank as moving in the opposite direction, in the same way to a man at Lanka the fixed stars appear to be going westward."

In the 10th century, some Muslim astronomers accepted that the Earth rotates around its axis. According to al-Biruni, al-Sijzi (d. c. 1020) invented an astrolabe called al-zūraqī based on the idea believed by some of his contemporaries "that the motion we see is due to the Earth's movement and not to that of the sky." The prevalence of this view is further confirmed by a reference from the 13th century which states: "According to the geometers [or engineers] (muhandisīn), the Earth is in constant circular motion, and what appears to be the motion of the heavens is actually due to the motion of the Earth and not the stars." Treatises were written to discuss its possibility, either as refutations or expressing doubts about Ptolemy's arguments against it. At the Maragha and Samarkand observatories, Earth's rotation was discussed by Tusi (born 1201) and Qushji (born 1403); the arguments and evidence they used resemble those used by Copernicus.

In medieval Europe, Thomas Aquinas accepted Aristotle's view and so, reluctantly, did John Buridan and Nicole Oresme in the fourteenth century. Not until Nicolaus Copernicus in 1543 adopted a heliocentric world system did the contemporary understanding of Earth's rotation begin to be established. Copernicus pointed out that if the movement of the Earth is violent, then the stars' movement must be much more so. He acknowledged the contribution of the Pythagoreans and pointed to examples of relative motion. For Copernicus, this was the first step in establishing the simpler pattern of planets circling a central Sun.

Tycho Brahe, who produced accurate observations on which Kepler based his laws of planetary motion, used Copernicus's work as the basis of a system assuming a stationary Earth. In 1600, William Gilbert strongly supported Earth's rotation in his treatise on Earth's magnetism and thereby influenced many of his contemporaries. Those like Gilbert who did not openly support or reject the motion of Earth about the Sun are called "semi-Copernicans". A century after Copernicus, Riccioli disputed the model of a rotating Earth due to the lack of then-observable eastward deflections in falling bodies; such deflections would later be called the Coriolis effect. However, the contributions of Kepler, Galileo, and Newton gathered support for the theory of the rotation of the Earth.

=== Empirical tests ===
Earth's rotation implies that the Equator bulges and the geographical poles are flattened. In his Principia, Newton predicted this flattening would amount to one part in 230, and pointed to the pendulum measurements taken by Richer in 1673 as corroboration of the change in gravity, but initial measurements of meridian lengths by Picard and Cassini at the end of the 17th century suggested the opposite. However, measurements by Maupertuis and the French Geodesic Mission in the 1730s established the oblateness of Earth, thus confirming the positions of both Newton and Copernicus.

In Earth's rotating frame of reference, a freely moving body follows an apparent path that deviates from the one it would follow in a fixed frame of reference. Because of the Coriolis effect, falling bodies veer slightly eastward from the vertical plumb line below their point of release, and projectiles veer right in the Northern Hemisphere (and left in the Southern) from the direction in which they are shot. The Coriolis effect is mainly observable at a meteorological scale, where it is responsible for the opposite directions of cyclone rotation in the Northern and Southern hemispheres (anticlockwise and clockwise, respectively).

Robert Hooke, following a suggestion from Newton in 1679, tried unsuccessfully to verify the predicted eastward deviation of a body dropped from a height of 8.2 meters, but definitive results were obtained later, in the late 18th and early 19th centuries, by Giovanni Battista Guglielmini in Bologna, Johann Friedrich Benzenberg in Hamburg and Ferdinand Reich in Freiberg, using taller towers and carefully released weights. (Note: See Fallexperimente zum Nachweis der Erdrotation (German Wikipedia article).) A ball dropped from a height of 158.5 m departed by 27.4 mm from the vertical compared with a calculated value of 28.1 mm.

The most celebrated test of Earth's rotation is the Foucault pendulum first built by physicist Léon Foucault in 1851, which consisted of a lead-filled brass sphere suspended 67 m from the top of the Panthéon in Paris. Because of Earth's rotation under the swinging pendulum, the pendulum's plane of oscillation appears to rotate at a rate depending on latitude. At the latitude of Paris, the predicted and observed shift was about 11 degrees clockwise per hour. Foucault pendulums now swing in museums worldwide.

== Periods ==
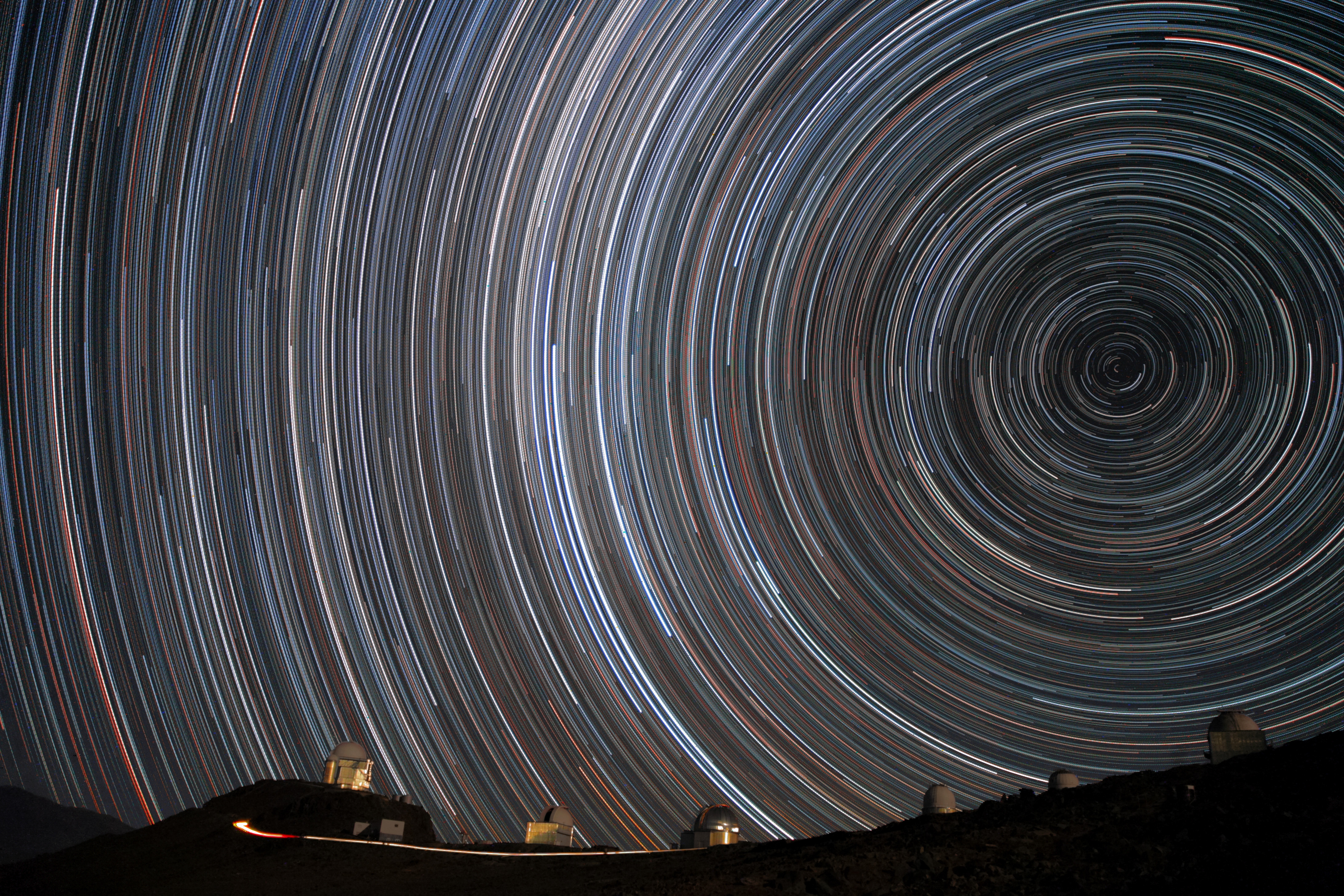
Starry circles arc around the south celestial pole, seen overhead at ESO's La Silla Observatory.

=== True solar day ===
Earth's rotation period relative to the Sun (solar noon to solar noon) is its true solar day or apparent solar day. It depends on Earth's orbital motion and is thus affected by changes in the eccentricity and inclination of Earth's orbit. Both vary over thousands of years, so the annual variation of the true solar day also varies. Generally, it is longer than the mean solar day during two periods of the year and shorter during another two. (Note: When Earth's eccentricity exceeds 0.047 and perihelion is at an appropriate equinox or solstice, only one period with one peak balances another period that has two peaks.) The true solar day tends to be longer near perihelion when the Sun apparently moves along the ecliptic through a greater angle than usual, taking about 10 seconds longer to do so. Conversely, it is about 10 seconds shorter near aphelion. It is about 20 seconds longer near a solstice when the projection of the Sun's apparent motion along the ecliptic onto the celestial equator causes the Sun to move through a greater angle than usual. Conversely, near an equinox the projection onto the equator is shorter by about 20 seconds. Currently, the perihelion and solstice effects combine to lengthen the true solar day near 22 December by 30 mean solar seconds, but the solstice effect is partially cancelled by the aphelion effect near 19 June when it is only 13 seconds longer. The effects of the equinoxes shorten it near 26 March and 16 September by 18 seconds and 21 seconds, respectively.

=== Mean solar day ===
The average of the true solar day during the course of an entire year is the mean solar day, which contains 86,400 mean solar seconds. Currently, each of these seconds is slightly longer than an SI second because Earth's mean solar day is now slightly longer than it was during the 19th century due to tidal friction. The average length of the mean solar day since the introduction of the leap second in 1972 has been about 0 to 2 ms longer than 86,400 SI seconds. Random fluctuations due to core-mantle coupling have an amplitude of about 5 ms. The mean solar second between 1750 and 1892 was chosen in 1895 by Simon Newcomb as the independent unit of time in his Tables of the Sun. These tables were used to calculate the world's ephemerides between 1900 and 1983, so this second became known as the ephemeris second. In 1967 the SI second was made equal to the ephemeris second.

The apparent solar time is a measure of Earth's rotation and the difference between it and the mean solar time is known as the equation of time.

=== Stellar and sidereal day ===
On a prograde planet like Earth, the stellar day is shorter than the solar day. At time 1, the Sun and a certain distant star are both overhead. At time 2, the planet has rotated 360 degrees and the distant star is overhead again but the Sun is not (1→2 = one stellar day). It is not until a little later, at time 3, that the Sun is overhead again (1→3 = one solar day).

Earth's rotation period relative to the International Celestial Reference Frame, called its stellar day by the International Earth Rotation and Reference Systems Service (IERS), is 86 164.098 903 691 seconds of mean solar time (UT1) (23^{h} 56^{m} 4.098903691^{s}, 0.99726966323716 mean solar days). (Note: Aoki, the ultimate source of these figures, uses the term "seconds of UT1" instead of "seconds of mean solar time".) Earth's rotation period relative to the precessing mean vernal equinox, named sidereal day, is 86164.09053083288 seconds of mean solar time (UT1) (23^{h} 56^{m} 4.09053083288^{s}, 0.99726956632908 mean solar days). Thus, the sidereal day is shorter than the stellar day by about 8.4 ms.

Both the stellar day and the sidereal day are shorter than the mean solar day by about 3 minutes 56 seconds. This is a result of the Earth turning 1 additional rotation, relative to the celestial reference frame, as it orbits the Sun (so 366.24 rotations/y). The mean solar day in SI seconds is available from the IERS for the periods 1623–2005 and 1962–2005.

Recently (1999–2010) the average annual length of the mean solar day in excess of 86,400 SI seconds has varied between 0.25 ms and 1 ms, which must be added to both the stellar and sidereal days given in mean solar time above to obtain their lengths in SI seconds (see Fluctuations in the length of day).

=== Angular speed ===
Plot of latitude versus tangential speed. The dashed line shows the Kennedy Space Center example. The dot-dash line denotes typical airliner cruise speed.

The angular speed of Earth's rotation in inertial space is (7.2921150 ± 0.0000001)×10^{−5} radians per SI second. (Note: It can be established that SI seconds apply to this value by following the citation in "USEFUL CONSTANTS" to E. Groten "Parameters of Common Relevance of Astronomy, Geodesy, and Geodynamics" which states units are SI units, except for an instance not relevant to this value.) Multiplying by (180°/π radians) × (86,400 seconds/day) yields 360.9856 °/day, indicating that Earth rotates more than 360 degrees relative to the fixed stars in one solar day. Earth's movement along its nearly circular orbit while it is rotating once around its axis requires that Earth rotate slightly more than once relative to the fixed stars before the mean Sun can pass overhead again, even though it rotates only once (360°) relative to the mean Sun. (Note: In astronomy, unlike geometry, 360° means returning to the same point in some cyclical time scale, either one mean solar day or one sidereal day for rotation on Earth's axis, or one sidereal year or one mean tropical year or even one mean Julian year containing exactly 365.25 days for revolution around the Sun.) Multiplying the value in rad/s by Earth's equatorial radius of 6,378,137 m (WGS84 ellipsoid) (factors of 2π radians needed by both cancel) yields an equatorial speed of 465.10 metres per second (1,674.4 km/h). Some sources state that Earth's equatorial speed is slightly less, or 1,669.8 km/h. This is obtained by dividing Earth's equatorial circumference by 24 hours. However, the use of the solar day is incorrect; it must be the sidereal day, so the corresponding time unit must be a sidereal hour. This is confirmed by multiplying by the number of sidereal days in one mean solar day, 1.002 737 909 350 795, which yields the equatorial speed in mean solar hours given above of 1,674.4 km/h.

The tangential speed of Earth's rotation at a point on Earth can be approximated by multiplying the speed at the equator by the cosine of the latitude. For example, the Kennedy Space Center is located at latitude 28.59° N, which yields a speed of: cos(28.59°) × 1,674.4 km/h = 1,470.2 km/h. Latitude is a placement consideration for spaceports.

While Everest is Earth's highest elevation (green) and Mauna Kea is tallest from its base (orange), Cayambe is farthest from Earth's axis (pink) and Chimborazo is farthest from Earth's centre (blue). Not to scale

The peak of the Cayambe volcano is the point of Earth's surface farthest from its axis; thus, it rotates the fastest as Earth spins.

Flat earth proponents sometimes argue that, if the Earth were in fact a rotating sphere, the tangential velocity at the equator would fling objects off into space. However, the force of gravity is approximately 290 times stronger than the centrifugal force due to rotation. This is found by comparing Newton's law of universal gravitation and the equation for centrifugal force. A 1 kg object would have a gravitational force attracting it to the earth of approximately 9.8 N, whereas the centrifugal force would be approximately 0.034 N at the equator.

== Changes ==
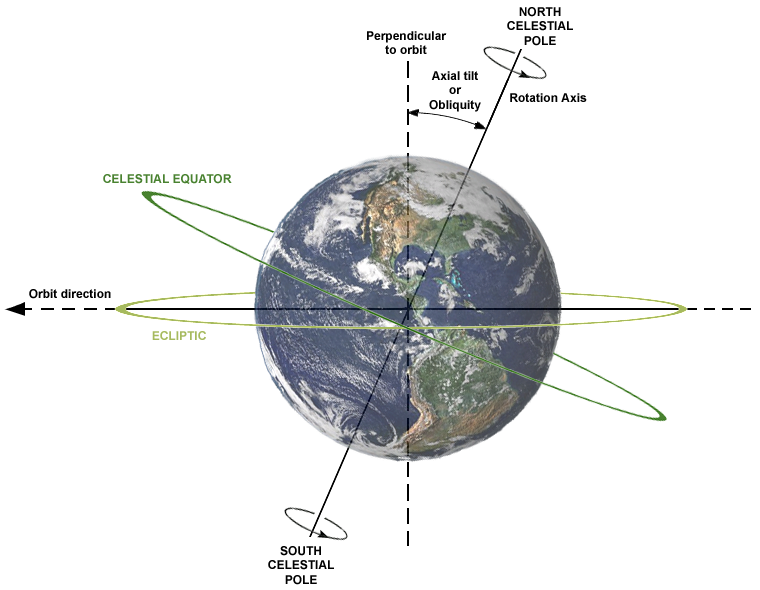
Earth's axial tilt is about 23.4°. It oscillates between 22.1° and 24.5° on a 41,000-year cycle and is currently decreasing.

=== In rotational axis ===
Earth's rotation axis moves with respect to the fixed stars (inertial space); the components of this motion are precession and nutation. It also moves with respect to Earth's crust; this is called polar motion.

Precession is a rotation of Earth's rotation axis, caused primarily by external torques from the gravity of the Sun, Moon, and other bodies. The polar motion is primarily due to free core nutation and the Chandler wobble.

=== In rotational speed ===
==== Tidal interactions ====
Over millions of years, Earth's rotation has been slowed significantly by tidal acceleration through gravitational interactions with the Moon. Thus angular momentum is slowly transferred to the Moon at a rate proportional to $r^{-6}$, where $r$ is the orbital radius of the Moon. This process has gradually increased the length of the day to its current value, and resulted in the Moon being tidally locked with Earth.

This gradual rotational deceleration is empirically documented by estimates of day lengths obtained from observations of tidal rhythmites and stromatolites; a compilation of these measurements found that the length of the day has increased steadily from about 21 hours at 600 Myr ago to the current 24-hour value. By counting the microscopic lamina that form at higher tides, tidal frequencies (and thus day lengths) can be estimated, much like counting tree rings, though these estimates can be increasingly unreliable at older ages.

==== Resonant stabilization ====
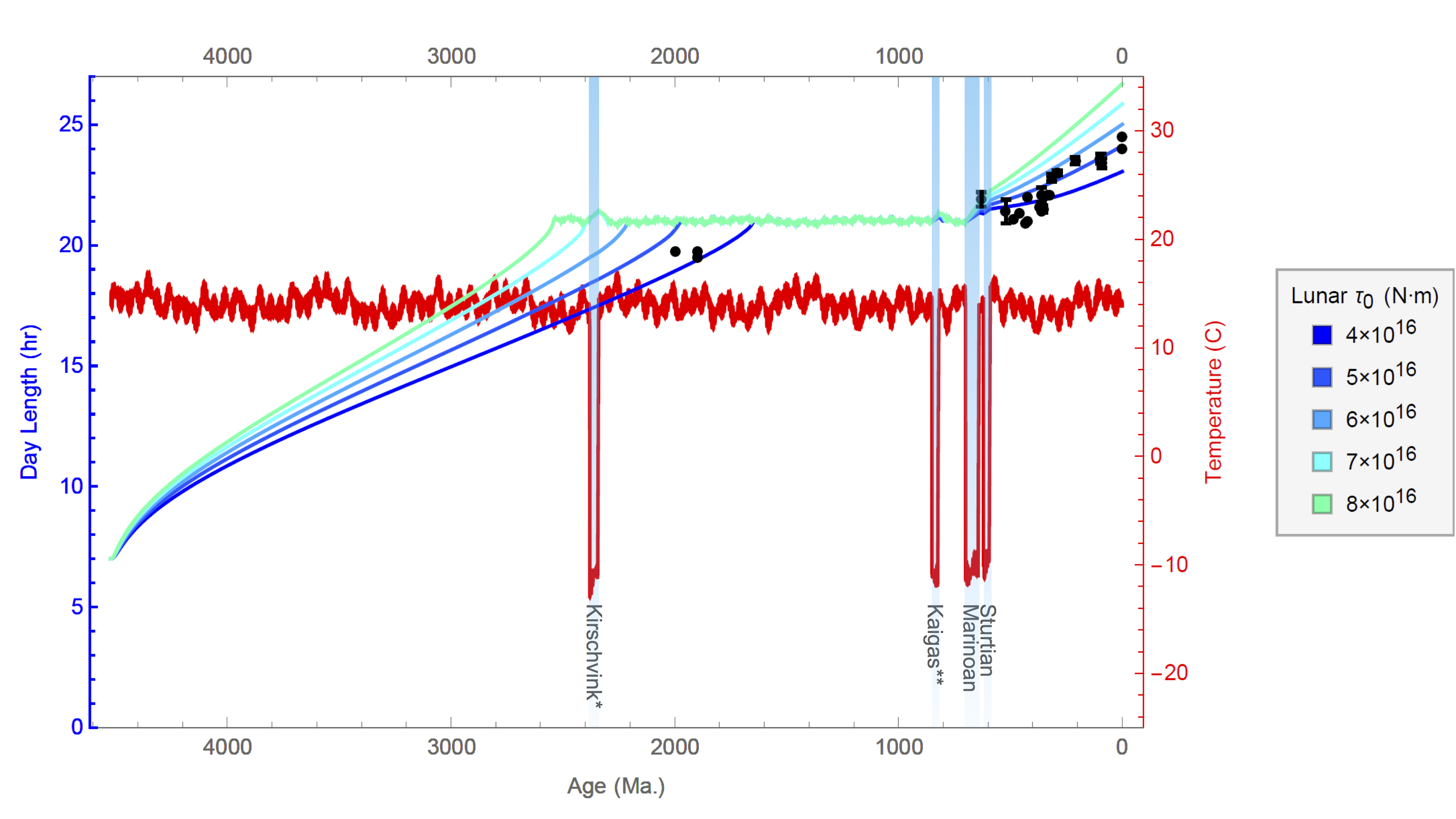
A simulated history of Earth's day length, depicting a resonant-stabilizing event throughout the Precambrian era

The current rate of tidal deceleration is anomalously high, implying Earth's rotational velocity must have decreased more slowly in the past. Empirical data tentatively shows a sharp increase in rotational deceleration about 600 Myr ago. Some models suggest that Earth maintained a constant day length of 21 hours throughout much of the Precambrian. This day length corresponds to the semidiurnal resonant period of the thermally driven atmospheric tide; at this day length, the decelerative lunar torque could have been canceled by an accelerative torque from the atmospheric tide, resulting in no net torque and a constant rotational period. This stabilizing effect could have been broken by a sudden change in global temperature. Recent computational simulations support this hypothesis and suggest the Marinoan or Sturtian glaciations broke this stable configuration about 600 Myr ago; the simulated results agree quite closely with existing paleo-rotational data.

==== Global events ====
Deviation of day length from SI-based day

Some recent large-scale events, such as the 2004 Indian Ocean earthquake, have caused the length of a day to shorten by 3 microseconds by reducing Earth's moment of inertia. Post-glacial rebound, ongoing since the last ice age, is also changing the distribution of Earth's mass, thus affecting the moment of inertia of Earth and, by the conservation of angular momentum, Earth's rotation period.

The length of the day can also be influenced by man-made structures. For example, NASA scientists calculated that the water stored in the Three Gorges Dam has increased the length of Earth's day by 0.06 microseconds due to the shift in mass.

=== Measurement ===
The primary monitoring of Earth's rotation is performed by very-long-baseline interferometry coordinated with the Global Positioning System, satellite laser ranging, and other satellite geodesy techniques. This provides an absolute reference for the determination of universal time, precession and nutation. The absolute value of Earth rotation including UT1 and nutation can be determined using space geodetic observations, such as very-long-baseline interferometry and lunar laser ranging, whereas their derivatives, denoted as length-of-day excess and nutation rates can be derived from satellite observations, such as GPS, GLONASS, Galileo and satellite laser ranging to geodetic satellites.

=== Ancient observations ===
There are recorded observations of solar and lunar eclipses by Babylonian and Chinese astronomers beginning in the 8th century BCE, as well as from the medieval Islamic world and elsewhere. These observations can be used to determine changes in Earth's rotation over the last 27 centuries, since the length of the day is a critical parameter in the calculation of the place and time of eclipses. A change in day length of milliseconds per century shows up as a change of hours and thousands of kilometers in eclipse observations. The ancient data are consistent with a shorter day, meaning Earth was turning faster throughout the past.

=== Cyclic variability ===
Around every 25–30 years Earth's rotation slows temporarily by a few milliseconds per day, usually lasting around five years. 2017 was the fourth consecutive year that Earth's rotation has slowed. The cause of this variability has not yet been determined.

== Origin ==
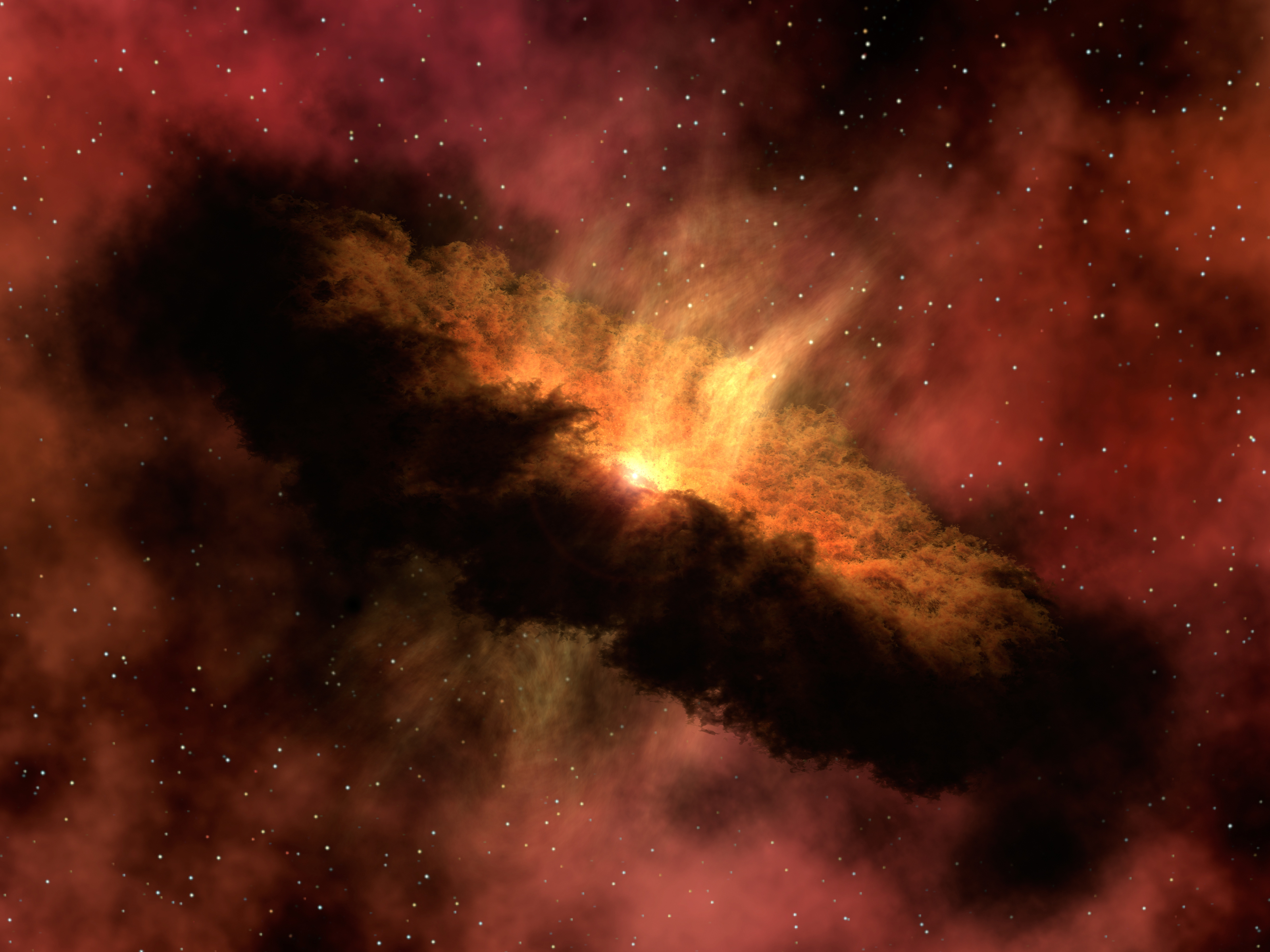
An artist's rendering of the protoplanetary disk

Earth's original rotation was a vestige of the original angular momentum of the cloud of dust, rocks and gas that coalesced to form the Solar System. This primordial cloud was composed of hydrogen and helium produced in the Big Bang, as well as heavier elements ejected by supernovas. As this interstellar dust is heterogeneous, any asymmetry during gravitational accretion resulted in the angular momentum of the eventual planet.

However, if the giant-impact hypothesis for the origin of the Moon is correct, this primordial rotation rate would have been reset by the Theia impact 4.5 billion years ago. Regardless of the speed and tilt of Earth's rotation before the impact, it would have experienced a day some five hours long after the impact. Tidal effects would then have slowed this rate to its modern value.

== See also ==
- Allais effect
- Diurnal cycle
- Earth's orbit
- Earth orientation parameters
- Formation and evolution of the Solar System
- Geodesic (in mathematics)
- Geodesics in general relativity
- Geodesy
- History of Earth
- History of geodesy
- Inner core super-rotation
- Nychthemeron
- Rossby wave
- Spherical Earth
- World Geodetic System
