= International Meridian =

May refer to

- any of the Prime Meridians that have been used, are used, or are proposed
- Greenwich Meridian established by the International Meridian Conference
- IERS Reference Meridian
