= Felipe González de Ahedo =

Spanish navigator and cartographer

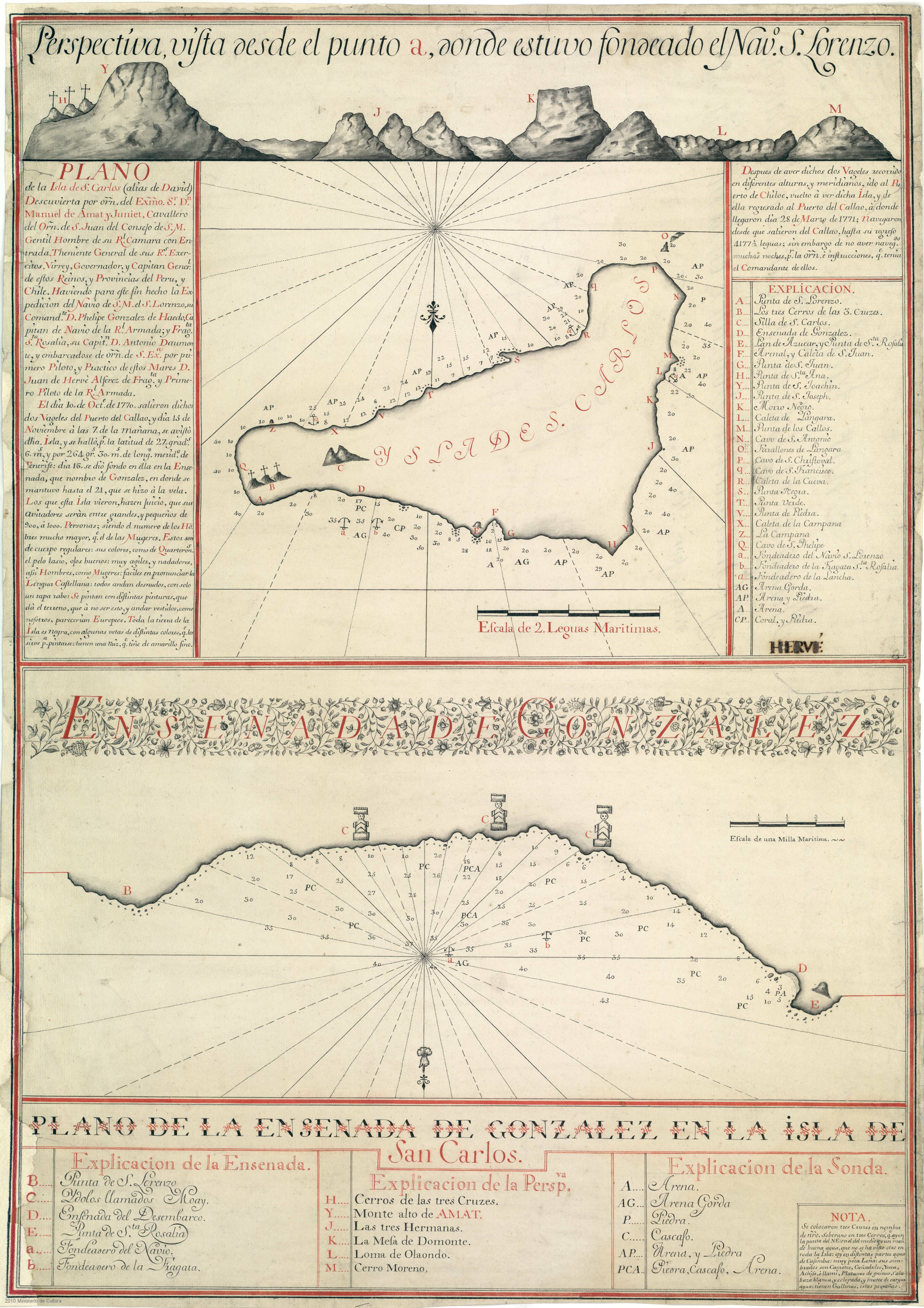
The map of Easter Island (renamed "Isla de San Carlos") from González de Ahedo's 1770 expedition. North is down.

Felipe González de Ahedo, also spelled Phelipe González y Haedo (13 May 1714 in Santoña, Cantabria – 26 October 1802), was a Spanish navigator and cartographer known for annexing Easter Island in 1770.

González de Ahedo commanded two Spanish ships, the Ship of the line San Lorenzo (70 guns) and the frigate Santa Rosalía (26 guns), sent by the Viceroy of Peru, Manuel de Amat y Juniet. They landed on 15 November 1770, only the second time Europeans had seen Easter Island, and stayed five days, thoroughly surveying the coast, and naming it Isla de San Carlos, while taking possession on behalf of King Charles III of Spain. They ceremoniously signed a treaty of annexation with the inhabitants and erected three wooden crosses on top of three small hills on Poike volcano.

They were amazed by the "standing idols", moai, all of which they could see were erect.

== Early life ==
Felipe González de Ahedo was born in Santona, Spain, circa 1700. Felipe's parents were referred to as respectable people but were not particularly wealthy at the time of their son's birth. Although his parents did not have much money, they supported him and his dreams of becoming a seaman. Because Felipe grew up in a small town right next to the sea, he developed a bond with the ocean at an early age. This bond eventually led him to choose his profession as a seafarer.

== Beginnings of a career ==
At the age of 25, Felipe González de Ahedo set out to solidify his career. He entered the Royal Armada of Spain and served on the ship San Bernardo as an apprentice. Just two years later, he was appointed to the Santiago. This is where he gained his reputation as a talented sailor and was noticed by his superiors.

== Adventures ==
It was 1730 when he joined the ship Aranzasu. On this boat, he traveled to the West Indies and back. This was his first real adventure in the New World. By 1736, González de Ahedo had joined a new ship, the Incendio, when it made its voyage to Veracruz; this was his first experience in Central America. After a few more years of service, González de Ahedo was finally promoted to the rank of junior lieutenant in 1751.

In 1760, González de Ahedo was given command of the frigate Arrogant. His job while commanding the frigate was to help protect eighteen ships sheltering in the Bay of Ferrol from enemy ships. After his experience on the frigate, González de Ahedo went on to serve on numerous ships of all shapes and sizes until 1766, when he was promoted to Commander of the Firme. He used the Firme to hunt down “piratical xebeques of Algiers.” Xebeques (also known as xebecs) are Mediterranean sailing ships mostly used for trading. While González de Ahedo did end up sighting many of these piratical xebeques, he was never able to capture one because his ship was not fast enough.

== The Annexation of Easter Island ==
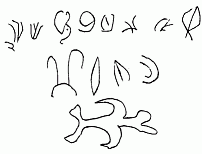
The native signatures on the 1770 Spanish treaty. (Note: These were traced from the original, which has since been lost, and so may not retain their original orientations. They were published with the long line vertical on the left, and the large glyph upright on the right.)

The year was 1769 when González de Ahedo was appointed to the command of the San Lorenzo. The San Lorenzo was an impressive ship with enough holes on its sides for 70 guns. González de Ahedo navigated this boat to “El Callao de Lima” carrying with him troops and military supplies. His voyage took over 6 months to complete and by the time he arrived, it was already 1770. After arriving in El Callao de Lima, the Viceroy (a ruler exercising authority in a colony on behalf of a sovereign) instructed González de Ahedo to take possession of Easter Island because Spain wanted it for itself. After returning from Easter Island, having annexed it, he was promoted once again to a Post Captain by the officials in El Callao de Lima.

According to the navigation data, after passing 280º of the Tenerife meridian (96º west longitude of Greenwich) they continued the trip staying at 27º south latitude. Finally, on Thursday November 15, 1770 at 7 a.m., they sighted Easter Island, which they erroneously identified with Davis Island, since although they had some 50 marine charts from different countries, the longitude in which said island was located was very different. At a distance of several leagues, they mistook the moai for very thick trees planted symmetrically. In addition, they could see that the island was covered with vegetation, which reached the edge of the sea, giving the impression of being very fertile. Although the Spanish did not know it, this was the second time that a European had seen Easter Island, since as they later found out, it had been found by chance by Jakob Roggeveen 48 years before.

The first sign that the island might be inhabited were three large puffs of smoke that the Spanish sailors sighted at a distance of a league from the north coast of the island, as they approached. Shortly after, at 2 in the afternoon, they saw a group of 28 people walking hurriedly on a hill near the coast. At first, due to the colorful clothing of the indigenous people, they thought they might be foreign troops, but as they got closer they could see that they were unarmed indigenous people.

Firstly, with the aim of locating a suitable anchorage for the boats, González de Ahedo ordered the departure of two boats, the first from the San Lorenzo, with lieutenant Alberto Olaondo in charge, guided by the pilot Juan Hervé, and with a sergeant and six soldiers on board. The second boat was from the Santa Rosalía, commanded by Lieutenant Buenaventura Moreno, guided by the pilot Francisco Agüera, and with Midshipman Juan Morales, two corporals, twelve soldiers and a pilot on board. The chosen place was an inlet well-sheltered from the wind and with a sandy bottom, which was baptized Ensenada de González and corresponds to the current Hanga Ho'onu or Turtle Bay. After this, the two boats, this time under the command of Lieutenant Cayetano de Lángara of the San Lorenzo and Lieutenant Hemeterio Heceta of the Santa Rosalía, departed with armed men and food with the mission of circumnavigating the island and taking note of the all kinds of data about its coast, noting everything that was of interest from the point of view of geography and contact with the indigenous people.

As soon as the ships were anchored, two natives swam up and were hauled on board by the sailors. The natives at no time were suspicious or frightened by the Spanish presence. Although their language could not be understood, the stay of the natives on the ships passed in a cordial climate. They were given clothes, which according to the sailors' diaries gave them great joy. At nightfall, the natives swam back to shore, although the next day a group of about 200 approached the ships, requesting more clothing from the Spaniards. The only jewelry they wore were shell and snail necklaces, although some wore plumes of feathers and dried herbs, which the Spaniards supposed was a sign of authority. Almost all of them had their bodies fully painted and wore loincloths. On the other hand, the men who were circumnavigating the island were visited by two canoes, each with two men, who delivered various provisions, such as bananas and chickens. For their part, the Spaniards gave them various items of clothing, as it seems that it was what most attracted the attention of the natives. The pilot Juan Hervé described the canoes as “five pieces of very narrow boards (because they don't have thick sticks on the ground), about a fourth, and for this reason they are so zealous that they have their counterweight to prevent them from tipping over; and I think these are the only ones on the whole island: instead of nails they put wooden dowels». During the night they spent in the cove today known as Vinapu, they observed that the indigenous people were taking earth from a nearby cave with which they painted their bodies. There they exchanged gifts with a hundred individuals, and at dawn they entered the island accompanied by the natives. They were invited to visit a large house, which was perhaps a temple, and during the march they were able to observe various crops of yams, cassava, white squash, sweet potatoes, plantains, and sugar cane, among others. They also noticed that the natives chewed and rubbed their bodies with a root (curcuma longa) to paint themselves yellow. Some wore blankets similar to ponchos made of mulberry fibers, which the Easterlings called mahute. In addition, according to the diaries of the expedition members, some Easter Islanders had very dilated earlobes with a large hole in which they placed earrings of various sizes made from dried cane leaves. Although the expedition's interpreters spoke to them in 26 different languages, they were unable to establish fluid verbal communication with the Easter Islanders. Despite everything, through drawings and gestures, a Rapanui-Spanish dictionary was created, consisting of 88 words plus the first 10 numbers. The natives lived for the most part in natural or artificial caves, although individuals of some authority lived in huts in the shape of an inverted boat, called hare vaka by the Islanders.

Most of the Spaniards estimated the population at about 1,000 inhabitants, although two sailors spoke of about 3,000. Something that caught the attention of the expedition members was not finding individuals among the people of Easter Island who looked over 50 years of age. According to some, the islanders indicated that the island's resources did not allow it to support more than 900 inhabitants, so once this number was reached, if a baby was born, the one over 60 years of age would be killed, and if there was none, the baby was killed. If this information was correct, it would explain, in addition to the fact of not finding elders on the island, the extreme confidence with which the natives approached the Spaniards from the first moment. When the Dutchman Jakob Roggeveen arrived on the island 48 years earlier, he ordered fire on the approaching natives, killing at least a dozen. According to Spanish observations, it is likely that there was no individual left who had lived through that experience in 1722. As for the fauna and flora of the island, the Spanish were not impressed, seeing only common seabirds that nested on the nearby islets, chickens, and some mice. On the other hand, according to one of the sailors, there was no tree to produce a board with a width of 6 inches. The terrain was described as mostly arid and low vegetation

== Final Years ==
By 1772, González de Ahedo had returned to Spain and exchanged his treasures for pesos. By doing this, he was able to obtain 119,521 pesos and finally bring some money to his family's name. In 1774, González de Ahedo made the trip to El Callao de Lima once again and in 1778, he was appointed to the ship San Isidoro by the king himself. By the time 1782 came around, González de Ahedo had been promoted to a Commodore and served on the ship San Eugenio. This was the last ship he would ever serve on. After his time with the San Eugenio, he retired from active service on the water but continued working in the Navy Office until his death. Felipe González de Ahedo died in 1792. He was around 92 years old and had served around 75 of those years on the sea.
