= Tenerife meridian =

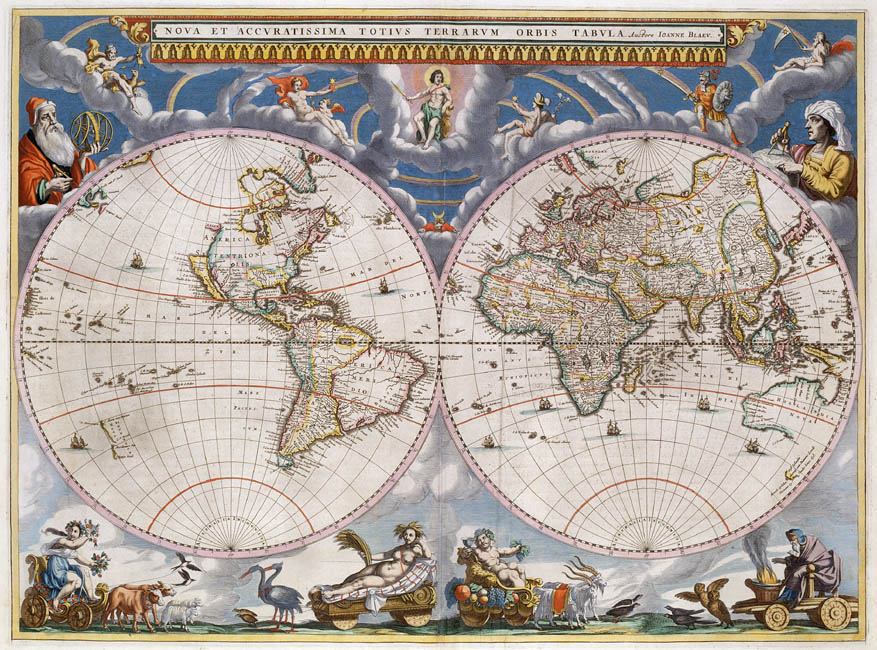
Joan Blaeu 1664 world map, Tenerife meridian based

The Tenerife meridian was the prime meridian of choice for Dutch cartographers and navigators from the 1640s until the beginning of the 19th century. It lies at 16° 38′ 22″ W of the current international prime meridian, the IERS Reference Meridian through Greenwich.

== Cartographers in the Low Countries ==
Cartographers like Mercator, Hondius and Blaeu played a significant role in the development of cartography around the turn of the seventeenth century. They were also among the first (in Europe) to deviate from the use of the Ferro meridian, which was based on the works of the Greek astronomer and geographer Ptolemy (c. AD 90 – c. 168). Mercator used prime meridians through Fuerteventura, the Azores and Boa Vista. Other mapmakers put their reference meridians through different places in the Canaries, the Azores, or the Cape Verde. Near the end of his career Mercator came under the influence of the idea that there could be a nature-given reference line where no difference would be observed between geographic and magnetic poles. His lead was followed by cartographers like Abraham Ortelius and Jodocus Hondius. Both inconclusive observations and new scientific theory, in particular that of Henry Gellibrand, put an end to this theory in the first half of the seventeenth century.

== Tenerife ==
Determination of longitude at sea was not possible without a considerable margin of error until the mid 18th century. One of the methods that was used instead was dead reckoning, from the last point of land sighted. Lizard Point in Cornwall was a famous starting point for this, as was the 3,718 metre Teide volcano of Tenerife. From the early 1640s some Dutch cartographers were using Tenerife as a prime meridian in maps, with a significant increase in use after 1662. Joan Blaeu started using it in 1663, Frederik de Wit in 1670, and German mapmakers Weigel and Homann in the 1720s/1730s. After 1675 Tenerife was the predominant meridian on Dutch maps and in 1787 the Amsterdam Admiralty issued a formal statement of support to the meridian.

== Decline ==
Also in 1787, the first Dutch translation of the Nautical Almanac was published. This almanac was one of the things that had spread the fame of the Greenwich meridian. By the turn of the 19th century Greenwich was becoming the meridian of choice for most of the maritime world, with the possible exception of the French and their Paris meridian. In 1826, the Dutch navy switched to Greenwich by royal decree. Without the backing of the Dutch, the meridian of Tenerife was hardly used anymore.

== Sources ==
- A.R.T. Jonkers, Parallel meridians: Diffusion and change in early modern oceanic reckoning, in Noord-Zuid in Oostindisch perspectief, The Hague, 2005.
- Forstner, G., Längenfehler und Ausgangsmeridiane in alten Landkarten und Positionstabelle (dissertation), Munich, 2004. Mainly p. 21-29. On the web here.
