= Prime meridian =

Line of longitude, at which longitude is defined to be 0°

Modern IERS Reference Meridian on Earth (interactive map)

Countries that touch the equator (red) and that touch the IERS Reference Meridian (blue)

A prime meridian is a meridian (a line of longitude) in a geographic coordinate system at which longitude is defined to be 0°. On a spheroid, a prime meridian and its anti-meridian (the 180th meridian in a 360-degree system) form a great ellipse. This divides the body (e.g. Earth) into two hemispheres: the Eastern Hemisphere and the Western Hemisphere (for an east-west notational system). Unlike the equator, which also divides a spherical celestial body into two hemispheres, the prime meridian is astronomically arbitrary. For each of Earth's historic prime meridians, various conventions have been used or advocated in different regions throughout history, but none (unlike the prime meridian of Mars) have a basis in physical geography. Earth's current international standard prime meridian is the IERS Reference Meridian. It is derived, but differs slightly, from the Greenwich Meridian, the previous standard.

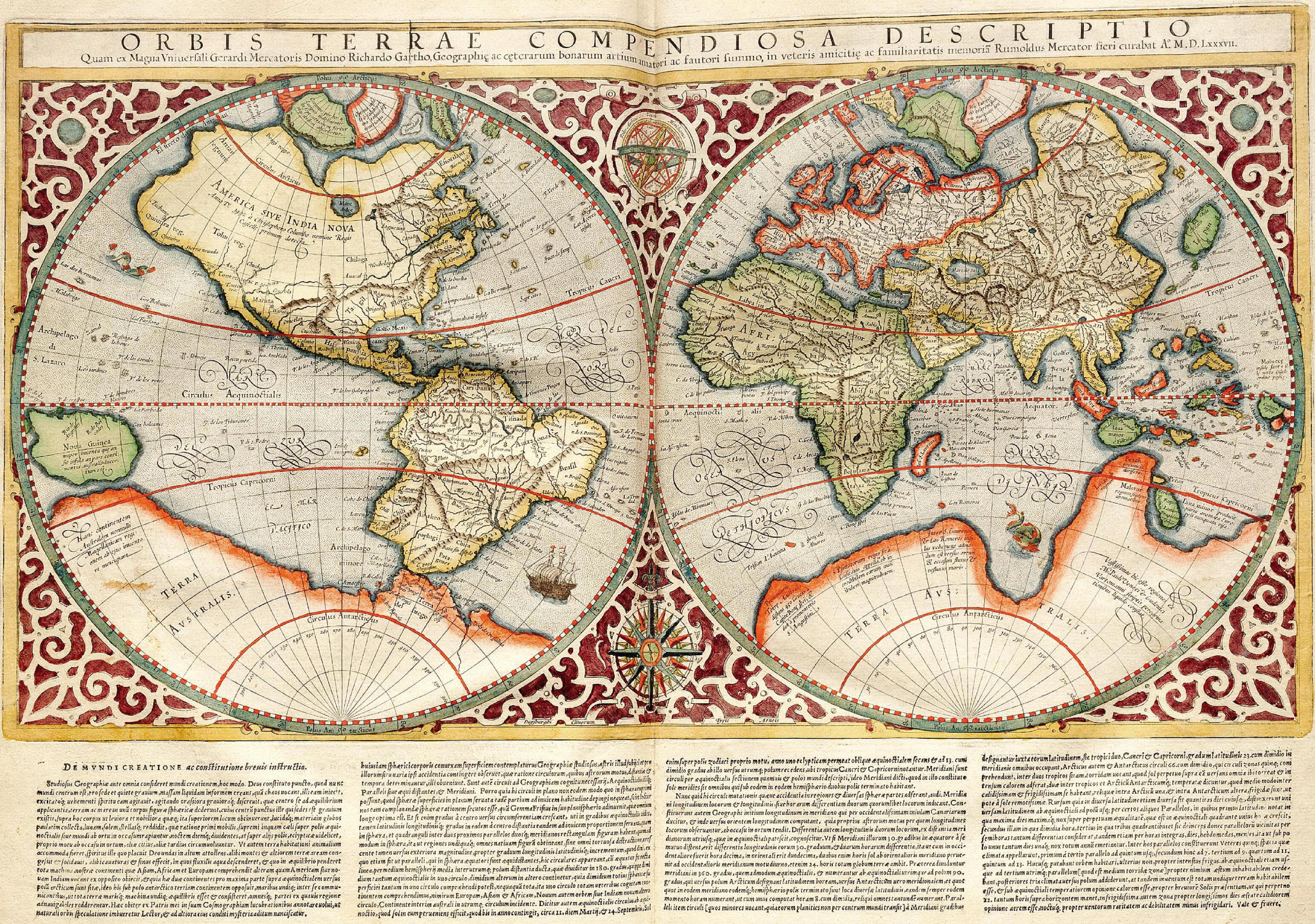
Gerardus Mercator in his Atlas Cosmographicae (1595) used a prime meridian somewhere close to 25°W, passing just to the west of Santa Maria Island in the Azores in the Atlantic Ocean. His 180th meridian runs along the Strait of Anián (Bering Strait)

Longitudes for the Earth and Moon are measured from their prime meridian (at 0°) to 180° east and west. For all other Solar System bodies, longitude is measured from 0° (their prime meridian) to 360°. West longitudes are used if the rotation of the body is prograde (or 'direct', like Earth), meaning that its direction of rotation is the same as that of its orbit. East longitudes are used if the rotation is retrograde.

== History ==
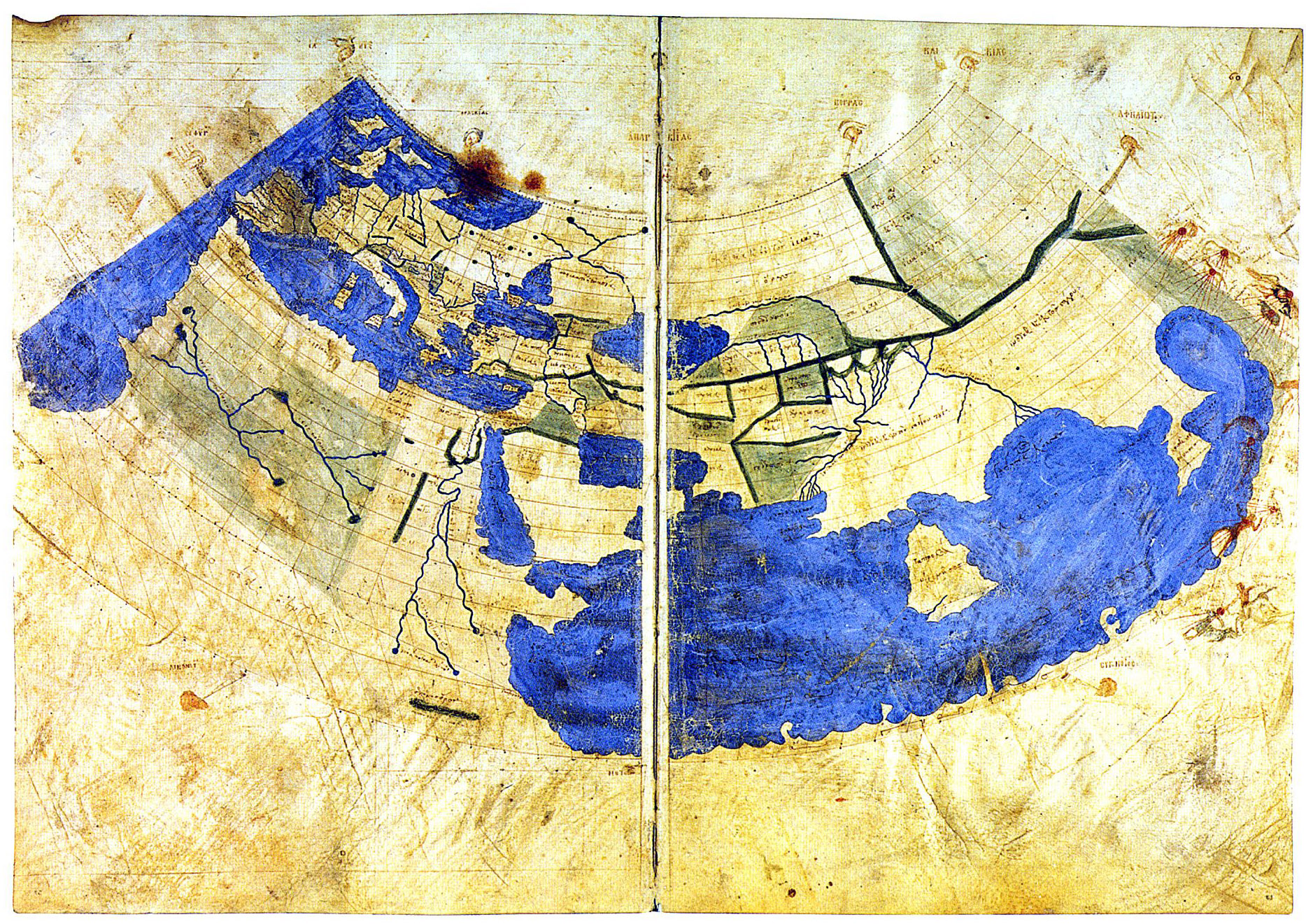
Ptolemy's 1st projection, redrawn under Maximus Planudes around 1300, using a prime meridian through the Canary Islands west of Africa, at the left-hand edge of the map (The obvious central line shown here is the junction of two sheets.)

The notion of longitude for Greeks was developed by the Greek Eratosthenes (c. 276 – 195 BCE) in Alexandria, and Hipparchus (c. 190 – 120 BCE) in Rhodes, and applied to a large number of cities by the geographer Strabo (64/63 BCE – c. 24 CE). Ptolemy (c. 90 – 168 CE) was the first geographer to use a consistent meridian for a world map, in his Geographia.

Ptolemy used as his basis the "Fortunate Isles", a group of islands in the Atlantic, which are usually associated with the Canary Islands (13°W to 18°W), although his maps correspond more closely to the Cape Verde islands (22°W to 25°W). The main point is to be comfortably west of the western tip of Africa (17°30′W) as negative numbers were not yet in use. His prime meridian corresponds to 18°40′ west of Winchester (about 20°W) today. At that time the chief method of determining longitude was by using the reported times of lunar eclipses in different countries.

One of the earliest known descriptions of standard time in India appeared in the 4th century CE astronomical treatise Surya Siddhanta. Postulating a spherical Earth, the book described the thousands years old customs of the prime meridian, or zero longitude, as passing through Avanti, the ancient name for the historic city of Ujjain in Central India, and Rohitaka, the ancient name for Rohtak (28°54′N 76°38′E), a city 750 km (470 mi) north.

William Grigg's facsimile of the 1529 Spanish Padron Real, from the copy made by Diogo Ribeiro and held by the Vatican Library

Ptolemy's Geographia was first printed with maps at Bologna in 1477, and many early globes in the 16th century followed his lead, but there was still a hope that a "natural" basis for a prime meridian existed. In 1493, Christopher Columbus reported that the compass pointed due north somewhere in mid-Atlantic, and this fact was used in the important Treaty of Tordesillas of 1494, which settled the territorial dispute between Spain and Portugal over newly discovered lands. The Tordesillas line was eventually settled at 370 leagues (about 2,190 kilometres (1,360 miles; 1,180 nautical miles)) west of Cape Verde. (Note: These figures use the legua náutica (nautical league) of four Roman miles totalling 5.926 km (3.682 mi), which was used by Spain during the 15th, 16th, and 17th centuries for navigation. Given the imprecision of the source, the calculation has been rounded to three significant digits. In 1897 Henry Harrise noted that Jaime Ferrer, the expert consulted by King Ferdinand and Queen Isabella, stated that a league was four miles of six stades each. Modern scholars agree that the geographic stade was the Roman or Italian stade, not any of several other Greek stades, supporting these figures. Harrise is in the minority when he uses the stade of 192.27 m (630.8 ft) marked within the stadium at Olympia, Greece, resulting in a league (32 stades) of 6.153 km (3.823 mi), 3.8% larger.) This is shown in the copies of Spain's Padron Real made by Diogo Ribeiro in 1527 and 1529. São Miguel Island (25°30′W) in the Azores was still used for the same reason as late as 1594 by Christopher Saxton, although by then it had been shown that the zero magnetic declination line did not follow a line of longitude.

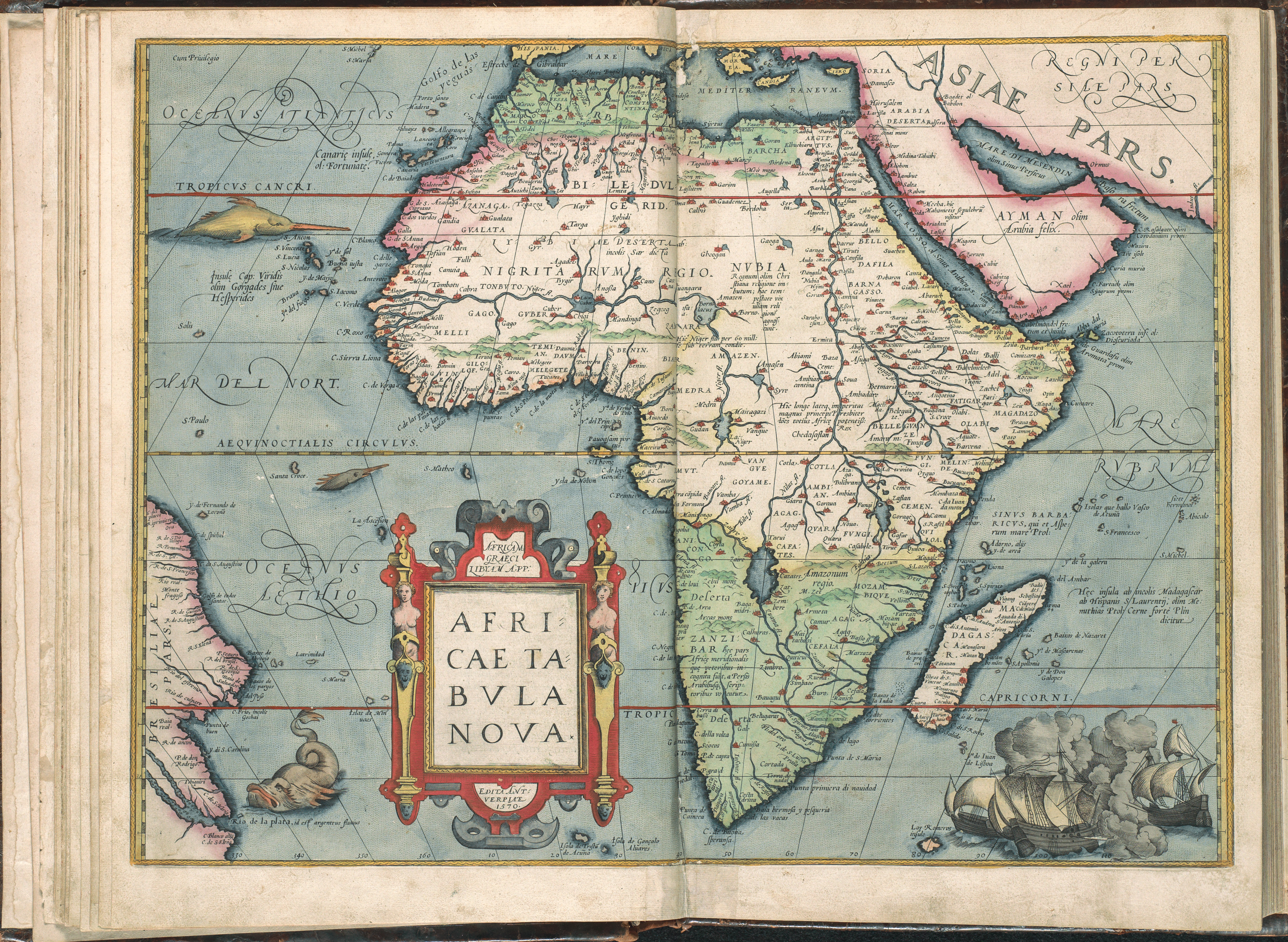
1571 Africa map by Abraham Ortelius, with Cape Verde marking its prime meridian

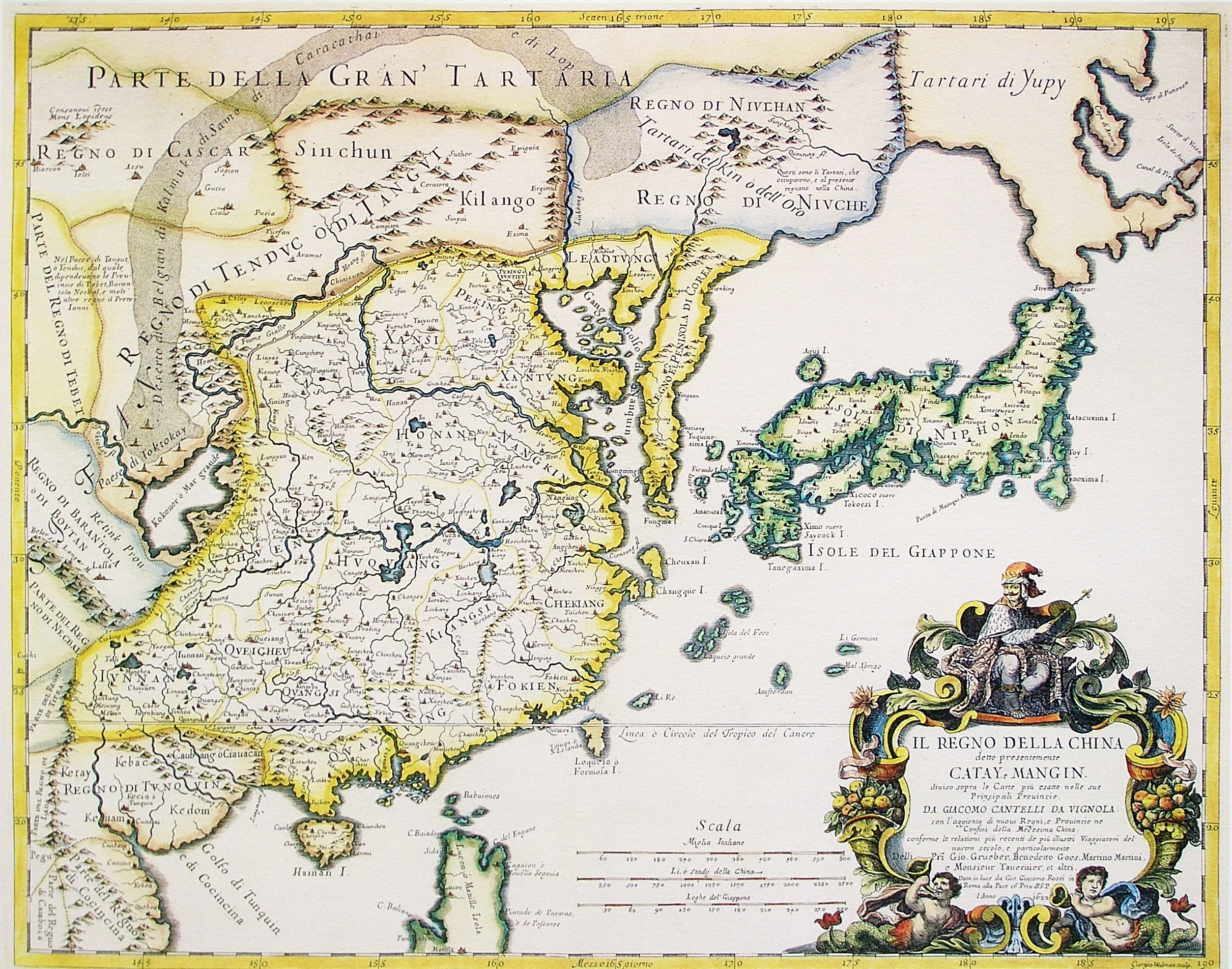
1682 map of East Asia by Giacomo Cantelli, with Cape Verde originating its prime meridian; Japan is thus located around 180° E.

In 1541, Mercator produced his 41 cm terrestrial globe and drew his prime meridian precisely through Fuerteventura (14°1′W) in the Canaries. His later maps used the Azores, following the magnetic hypothesis, but by the time that Ortelius produced the first modern atlas in 1570, other islands such as Cape Verde were coming into use. In his atlas longitudes were counted from 0° to 360°, not 180°W to 180°E as is usual today. This practice was followed by navigators well into the 18th century. In 1634, Cardinal Richelieu used the westernmost island of the Canaries, El Hierro, 19°55′ west of Paris, as the choice of meridian. The geographer Delisle decided to round this off to 20°, so that it simply became the meridian of Paris disguised.

In the early 18th century, the battle was on to improve the determination of longitude at sea, leading to the development of the marine chronometer by John Harrison. The development of accurate star charts, principally by the first British Astronomer Royal, John Flamsteed between 1680 and 1719 and disseminated by his successor Edmund Halley, enabled navigators to use the lunar method of determining longitude more accurately using the octant developed by Thomas Godfrey and John Hadley.

In the 18th century most countries in Europe adapted their own prime meridian, usually through their capital, hence in France the Paris meridian was prime, in Prussia it was the Berlin meridian, in Denmark the Copenhagen meridian, and in United Kingdom the Greenwich meridian.

Between 1765 and 1811, Nevil Maskelyne published 49 issues of the Nautical Almanac based on the meridian of the Royal Observatory, Greenwich. "Maskelyne's tables not only made the lunar method practicable, they also made the Greenwich meridian the universal reference point. Even the French translations of the Nautical Almanac retained Maskelyne's calculations from Greenwich – in spite of the fact that every other table in the Connaissance des Temps considered the Paris meridian as the prime."

In 1884, at the International Meridian Conference in Washington, D.C., 22 countries voted to adopt the Greenwich meridian as the prime meridian of the world. The French argued for a neutral line, mentioning the Azores and the Bering Strait, but eventually abstained and continued to use the Paris meridian until 1911.

The current international standard Prime Meridian is the IERS Reference Meridian. The International Hydrographic Organization adopted an early version of the IRM in 1983 for all nautical charts. It was adopted for air navigation by the International Civil Aviation Organization on 3 March 1989.

== International prime meridian ==
Since 1984, the international standard for the Earth's prime meridian is the IERS Reference Meridian. Between 1884 and 1984, the meridian of Greenwich was the world standard. These meridians are very close to each other.

=== Prime meridian at Greenwich ===
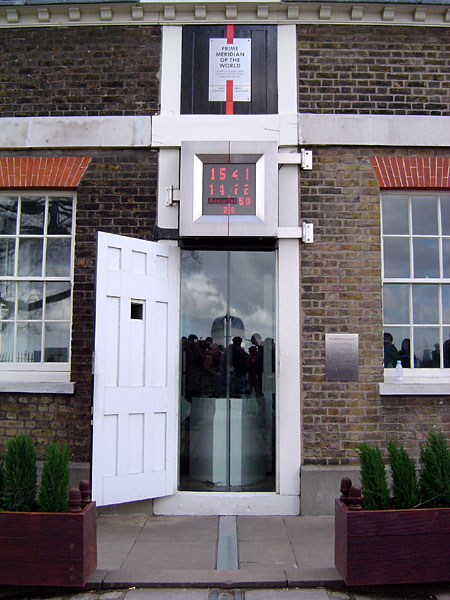
The line of the Greenwich meridian at the Royal Observatory, Greenwich, England

In October 1884 the Greenwich Meridian was selected by delegates (forty-one delegates representing twenty-five nations) to the International Meridian Conference held in Washington, D.C., United States, to be the common zero of longitude and standard of time reckoning throughout the world. (Note: Voting took place on 13 October and the resolutions were adopted on 22 October 1884. The modern prime meridian, the IERS Reference Meridian, is placed very near this meridian.)

The position of the historic prime meridian, based at the Royal Observatory, Greenwich, was established by Sir George Airy in 1851. It was defined by the location of the Airy Transit Circle ever since the first observation he took with it. Prior to that, it was defined by a succession of earlier transit instruments, the first of which was acquired by the second Astronomer Royal, Edmond Halley in 1721. It was set up in the extreme north-west corner of the Observatory between Flamsteed House and the Western Summer House. This spot, now subsumed into Flamsteed House, is roughly 43 metres (47 yards) to the west of the Airy Transit Circle, a distance equivalent to roughly 2 seconds of longitude. It was Airy's transit circle that was adopted in principle (with French delegates, who pressed for adoption of the Paris meridian abstaining) as the Prime Meridian of the world at the 1884 International Meridian Conference.

All of these Greenwich meridians were located via an astronomic observation from the surface of the Earth, oriented via a plumb line along the direction of gravity at the surface. This astronomic Greenwich meridian was disseminated around the world, first via the lunar distance method, then by chronometers carried on ships, then via telegraph lines carried by submarine communications cables, then via radio time signals. One remote longitude ultimately based on the Greenwich meridian using these methods was that of the North American Datum 1927 or NAD27, an ellipsoid whose surface best matches mean sea level under the United States.

=== IERS Reference Meridian ===
Beginning in 1973 the International Time Bureau and later the International Earth Rotation and Reference Systems Service changed from reliance on optical instruments like the Airy Transit Circle to techniques such as lunar laser ranging, satellite laser ranging, and very-long-baseline interferometry. The new techniques resulted in the IERS Reference Meridian, the plane of which passes through the centre of mass of the Earth. This differs from the plane established by the Airy transit, which is affected by vertical deflection (the local vertical is affected by influences such as nearby mountains). The change from relying on the local vertical to using a meridian based on the centre of the Earth caused the modern prime meridian to be 5.3″ east of the astronomic Greenwich prime meridian through the Airy Transit Circle. At the latitude of Greenwich, this amounts to 102 metres (112 yards). This was officially accepted by the Bureau International de l'Heure (BIH) in 1984 via its BTS84 (BIH Terrestrial System) that later became WGS84 (World Geodetic System 1984) and the various International Terrestrial Reference Frames (ITRFs).

Due to the movement of Earth's tectonic plates, the line of 0° longitude along the surface of the Earth has slowly moved toward the west from this shifted position by a few centimetres; that is, towards the Airy Transit Circle (or the Airy Transit Circle has moved toward the east, depending on your point of view) since 1984 (or the 1960s). With the introduction of satellite technology, it became possible to create a more accurate and detailed global map. With these advances there also arose the necessity to define a reference meridian that, whilst being derived from the Airy Transit Circle, would also take into account the effects of plate movement and variations in the way that the Earth was spinning. As a result, the IERS Reference Meridian was established and is commonly used to denote the Earth's prime meridian (0° longitude) by the International Earth Rotation and Reference Systems Service, which defines and maintains the link between longitude and time. Based on observations to satellites and celestial compact radio sources (quasars) from various coordinated stations around the globe, Airy's transit circle drifts northeast about 2.5 centimetres (1 inch) per year relative to this Earth-centred 0° longitude.

It is also the reference meridian of the Global Positioning System operated by the United States Department of Defense, and of WGS84 and its two formal versions, the ideal International Terrestrial Reference System (ITRS) and its realization, the International Terrestrial Reference Frame (ITRF). (Note: The astronomic latitude of the Royal Observatory is 51°28′38″N whereas its latitude on the European Terrestrial Reference Frame (1989) datum is 51°28′40.1247″N.) A current convention on the Earth uses the line of longitude 180° opposite the IRM as the basis for the International Date Line.

==== List of places ====
On Earth, starting at the North Pole and heading south to the South Pole, the IERS Reference Meridian (as of 2016) passes through 8 countries, 4 seas, 3 oceans and 1 channel:

The prime meridian on a globe

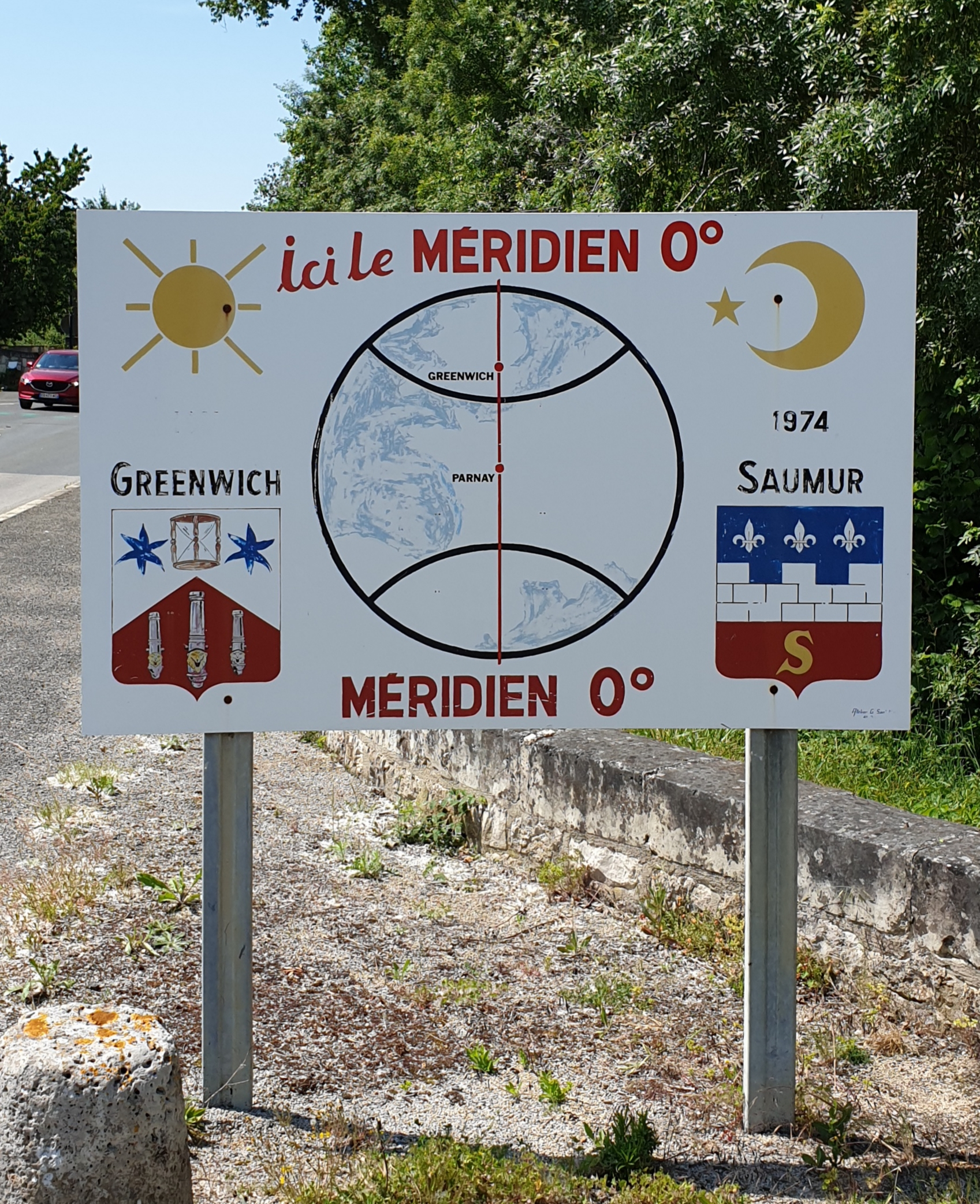
The prime meridian sign in Parnay, Maine-et-Loire, France

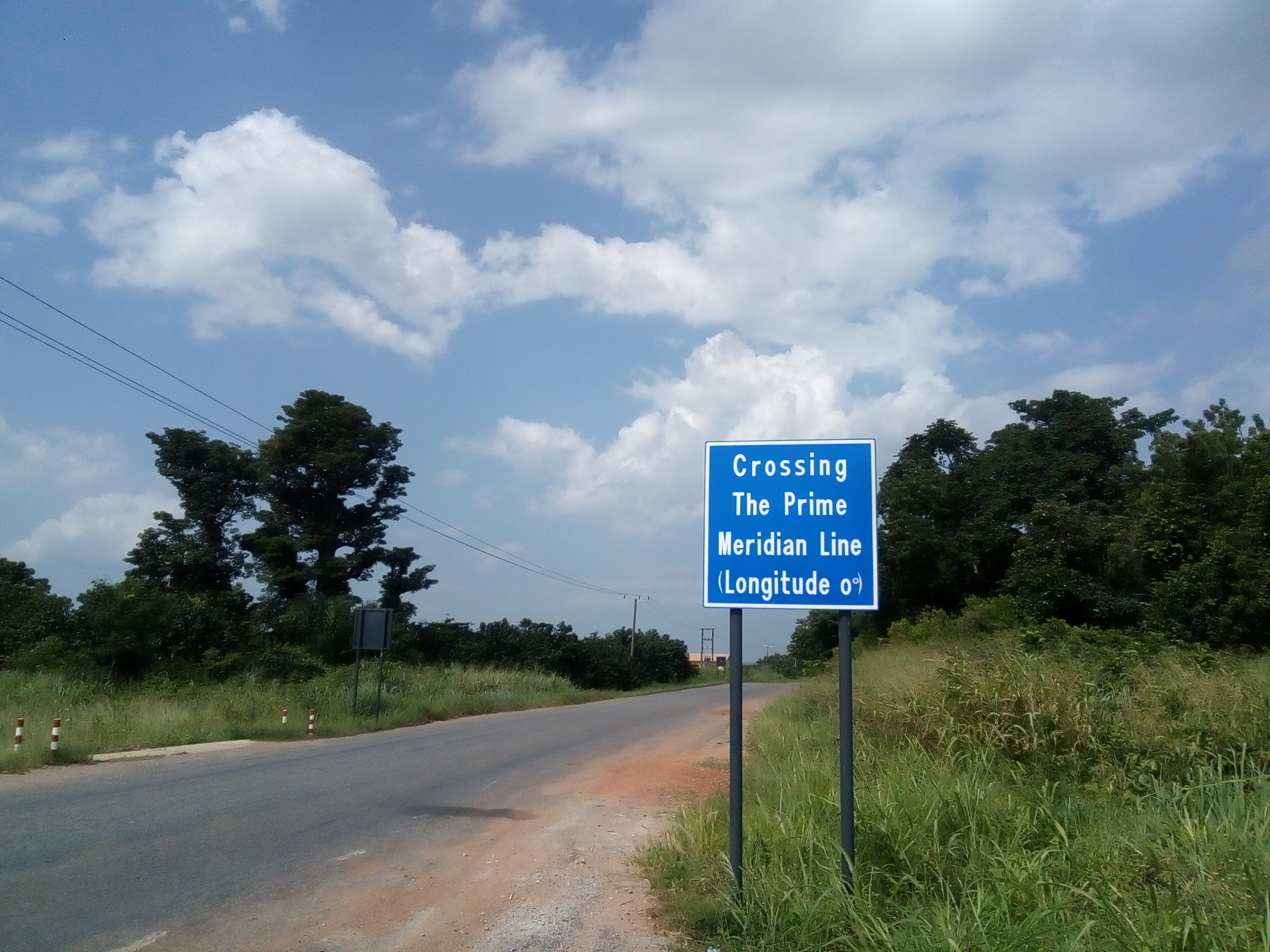
Prime meridian sign near Somanya, Ghana

Co-ordinates (approximate)	Country, territory or sea	Notes
90°0′N 0°0′E	North Pole and Arctic Ocean	
85°46′N 0°0′E	Exclusive Economic Zone (EEZ) of Greenland (Denmark)	
81°39′N 0°0′E	Greenland Sea	
80°29′N 0°0′E	EEZ of Svalbard (Norway)	
76°11′N 0°0′E	International waters	
73°44′N 0°0′E	EEZ of Jan Mayen (Norway)	
72°53′N 0°0′E	Norwegian Sea	
69°7′N 0°0′E	International waters	
64°42′N 0°0′E	EEZ of Norway	
63°29′N 0°0′E	EEZ of Great Britain	
61°0′N 0°0′E	North Sea	
53°46′N 0°0′E	United Kingdom	From Tunstall in East Riding to Peacehaven, passing through Greenwich
50°47′N 0°0′E	English Channel	EEZ of Great Britain
50°14′N 0°0′E	English Channel	EEZ of France
49°20′N 0°0′E	France	From Villers-sur-Mer to Gavarnie
42°41′N 0°0′E	Spain	From Cilindro de Marboré to Castellón de la Plana
39°56′N 0°0′E	Mediterranean Sea	Gulf of Valencia; EEZ of Spain
38°52′N 0°0′E	Spain	From El Verger to Calp
38°38′N 0°0′E	Mediterranean Sea	EEZ of Spain
37°1′N 0°0′E	Mediterranean Sea	EEZ of Algeria
35°50′N 0°0′E	Algeria	From Stidia to Algeria-Mali border near Bordj Badji Mokhtar
21°52′N 0°0′E	Mali	Passing through Gao
15°00′N 0°0′E	Burkina Faso	For about 432 km (268 mi), running through Cinkassé.
11°7′N 0°0′E	Togo	For about 3.4 km (2.1 mi)
11°6′N 0°0′E	Ghana	For about 16 km (10 mi)
10°58′N 0°0′E	Togo	For about 39 km (24 mi)
10°37′N 0°0′E	Ghana	From the Togo-Ghana border near Bunkpurugu to Tema; Passing through Lake Volta at 7°46′N 0°0′E
5°37′N 0°0′E	Atlantic Ocean	EEZ of Ghana
1°58′N 0°0′E	Atlantic Ocean	International waters
0°0′N 0°0′E	Atlantic Ocean	Passing through the Equator (see Null Island)
51°43′S 0°0′E	Atlantic Ocean	EEZ of Bouvet Island (Norway)
57°13′S 0°0′E	Atlantic Ocean	International waters
60°0′S 0°0′E	Southern Ocean	International waters
69°36′S 0°0′E	Antarctica	Queen Maud Land, claimed by Norway
90°0′S 0°0′E	Antarctica	Amundsen–Scott South Pole Station, South Pole

== Prime meridian on other celestial bodies ==
As on the Earth, prime meridians must be arbitrarily defined. Often a landmark such as a crater is used; other times a prime meridian is defined by reference to another celestial object, or by magnetic fields. The prime meridians of the following planetographic systems have been defined:

- Two different heliographic coordinate systems are used on the Sun. The first is the Carrington heliographic coordinate system. In this system, the prime meridian passes through the center of the solar disk as seen from the Earth on 9 November 1853, which is when the English astronomer Richard Christopher Carrington started his observations of sunspots. The second is the Stonyhurst heliographic coordinates system, originated at Stonyhurst Observatory in Lancashire, England.
- In 1975 the prime meridian of Mercury was defined to be 20° east of the crater Hun Kal. This meridian was chosen because it runs through the point on Mercury's equator where the average temperature is highest (due to the planet's rotation and orbit, the sun briefly retrogrades at noon at this point during perihelion, giving it more sunlight).
- Defined in 1992, the prime meridian of Venus passes through the central peak in the crater Ariadne, chosen arbitrarily.
- The prime meridian of the Moon lies directly in the middle of the face of the Moon visible from Earth and passes near the crater Bruce.
- The prime meridian of Mars was established in 1971 and passes through the center of the crater Airy-0, although it is fixed by the longitude of the Viking 1 lander, which is defined to be 47.95137°W.
- The prime meridian on Ceres runs through the Kait crater, which was arbitrarily chosen because it is near the equator (about 2° south).
- The prime meridian on 4 Vesta is 4 degrees east of the crater Claudia, chosen because it is sharply defined.
- Jupiter has several coordinate systems because its cloud tops—the only part of the planet visible from space—rotate at different rates depending on latitude. It is unknown whether Jupiter has any internal solid surface that would enable a more Earth-like coordinate system. System I and System II coordinates are based on atmospheric rotation, and System III coordinates use Jupiter's magnetic field. The prime meridians of Jupiter's four Galilean moons were established in 1979.
  - Europa's prime meridian is defined such that the crater Cilix is at 182° W. The 0° longitude runs through the middle of the face that is always turned towards Jupiter.
  - Io's prime meridian, like that of Earth's moon, is defined so that it runs through the middle of the face that is always turned towards Jupiter (the near side, known as the subjovian hemisphere).
  - Ganymede's prime meridian is defined such that the crater Anat is at 128° W, and the 0° longitude runs through the middle of the subjovian hemisphere.
  - Callisto's prime meridian is defined such that the crater Saga is at 326° W.
- Titan is the largest moon of Saturn and, like the Earth's moon, is tidally locked and always has the same face towards Saturn. The middle of that face is 0 longitude.
- Like Jupiter, Neptune is a gas giant, so any surface is obscured by clouds. The prime meridian of its largest moon, Triton, was established in 1991.
- Pluto's prime meridian is defined as the meridian passing through the center of the face that is always towards Charon, its largest moon, as the two are tidally locked to each other. Charon's prime meridian is similarly defined as the meridian always facing directly toward Pluto.

== List of historic prime meridians on Earth ==
Locality	Modern longitude	Meridian name	Image	Comment
Bering Strait	168°30′ W		168th meridian west (interactive map)	Offered in 1884 as possibility for a neutral prime meridian by Pierre Janssen at the International Meridian Conference
Washington, D.C.	77°03′56.07″ W (1897) or 77°04′02.24″ W (NAD 27) or 77°04′01.16″ W (NAD 83)	New Naval Observatory meridian	77th meridian west (interactive map)	
Washington, D.C.	77°02′48.0″ W, 77°03′02.3″, 77°03′06.119″ W or 77°03′06.276″ W (both presumably NAD 27). If NAD27, the latter would be 77°03′05.194″ W (NAD 83)	Old Naval Observatory meridian	77th meridian west (interactive map)	
Washington, D.C.	77°02′11.56299″ W (NAD 83), 77°02′11.55811″ W (NAD 83), 77°02′11.58325″ W (NAD 83) (three different monuments originally intended to be on the White House meridian)	White House meridian	77th meridian west (interactive map)	
Washington, D.C.	77°00′32.6″ W (NAD 83)	Capitol meridian	77th meridian west (interactive map)	
Philadelphia	75° 10′ 12″ W		75th meridian west (interactive map)	
Rio de Janeiro	43° 10′ 19″ W		43rd meridian west (interactive map)	
Azores	25° 40′ 32″ W		25th meridian west (interactive map)	Proposed as one possible neutral meridian by Pierre Janssen at the International Meridian Conference
El Hierro (Ferro), Canary Islands	18° 03′ W, later redefined as 17° 39′ 46″ W	Ferro meridian	18th meridian west (interactive map)	
Tenerife	16°38′22″ W	Tenerife meridian	16th meridian west (interactive map)	Rose to prominence with Dutch cartographers and navigators after they abandoned the idea of a magnetic meridian
Lisbon	9° 07′ 54.862″ W		9th meridian west (interactive map)	
Cádiz	6° 17′ 35.4" W	Cádiz meridian	6th meridian west (interactive map)	Royal Observatory in southeast tower of Castillo de la Villa, used 1735–1850 by Spanish Navy.
Madrid	3° 41′ 16.58″ W		3rd meridian west (interactive map)	
Kew	0° 00′ 19.0″ W	Prime Meridian (prior to Greenwich)	Prime meridian (interactive map)	Located at King George III's Kew Observatory
Greenwich	0° 00′ 05.33″ W	United Kingdom Ordnance Survey Zero Meridian	Prime meridian (interactive map)	Bradley Meridian
Greenwich	0° 00′ 05.3101″ W	Greenwich meridian	Prime meridian (interactive map)	Airy Meridian
Greenwich	0° 00′ 00.00″	IERS Reference Meridian	Prime meridian (interactive map)	
Paris	2° 20′ 14.025″ E	Paris meridian	2nd meridian east (interactive map)	
Brussels	4° 22′ 4.71″ E		4th meridian east (interactive map)	
Antwerp	4° 24′ E	Antwerp meridian	4th meridian east (interactive map)	
Amsterdam	4° 53′ E		4th meridian east (interactive map)	Through the Westerkerk in Amsterdam; used to define the legal time in the Netherlands from 1909 to 1937
Pisa	10° 24′ E		10th meridian east (interactive map)	
Oslo (Kristiania)	10° 43′ 22.5″ E		10th meridian east (interactive map)	
Florence	11°15′ E	Florence meridian	11th meridian east (interactive map)	Used in the Peters projection, 180° from a meridian running through the Bering Strait
Rome	12° 27′ 08.4″ E	Meridian of Monte Mario	12th meridian east (interactive map)	Used in Roma 40 Datum
Copenhagen	12° 34′ 32.25″ E		12th meridian east (interactive map)	Rundetårn
Naples	14° 15′ E		14th meridian east (interactive map)	
Pressburg	17° 06′ 03″ E	Meridianus Posoniensis	17th meridian east (interactive map)	Used by Sámuel Mikoviny
Stockholm	18° 03′ 29.8″ E		18th meridian east (interactive map)	At the Stockholm Observatory
Buda	19° 03′ 37″ E	Meridianu(s) Budense	19th meridian east (interactive map)	Used between 1469 and 1495; introduced by Regiomontanus, used by Marcin Bylica, Galeotto Marzio, Miklós Erdélyi (1423–1473), Johannes Tolhopff (c. 1445–1503), Johannes Muntz. Set in the royal castle (and observatory) of Buda. (Note: When Tolhopff handed over his book, titled Stellarium (1480), to King Matthias Corvinus, he emphasized that he had used the meridian of Buda for his calculations. The German physician, Johannes Müntz used it the same way in his 1495 calendar. However, in the second edition, he used the Vienna meridian.)
Kraków	19° 57′ 21.43″ E	Kraków meridian	19th meridian east (interactive map)	at the Old Kraków Observatory at the Śniadecki' College; mentioned also in Nicolaus Copernicus's work On the Revolutions of the Heavenly Spheres.
Warsaw	21° 00′ 42″ E	Warsaw meridian	21st meridian east (interactive map)	
Várad	21° 55′ 16″ E	Tabulae Varadienses	21st meridian east (interactive map)	Between 1464 and 1667, a prime meridian was set in the Fortress of Oradea (Varadinum at the time) by Georg von Peuerbach. In his logbook Columbus stated, he had one copy of Tabulae Varadienses (Tabula Varadiensis or Tabulae directionum) on board to calculate the actual meridian based on the position of the Moon, in correlation to Várad. Amerigo Vespucci also recalled, how was he acquired the knowledge to calculate meridians by means of these tables.
Alexandria	29° 53′ E	Meridian of Alexandria	29th meridian east (interactive map)	The meridian of Ptolemy's Almagest.
Saint Petersburg	30° 19′ 42.09″ E	Pulkovo meridian	30th meridian east (interactive map)	
Great Pyramid of Giza	31° 08′ 03.69″ E		31st meridian east (interactive map)	1884
Jerusalem	35° 13′ 47.1″ E		35th meridian east (interactive map)	
Mecca	39° 49′ 34″ E		39th meridian east (interactive map)	See also Mecca Time
	Approx. 59° E		59th meridian east (interactive map)	Maimonides calls this point (24 degrees east of Jerusalem) אמצע היישוב, "the middle of the habitation", i.e. the habitable hemisphere. Evidently this was a convention accepted by Arab geographers of his day.
Ujjain	75° 47′ E		75th meridian east (interactive map)	Used from 4th century CE Indian astronomy and calendars(see also Time in India).
Beijing	116° 24′ E		116th meridian east (interactive map)	Used in Qing dynasty for astronomical and cartographical purposes.
Kyoto	136° 14′ E		136th meridian east (interactive map)	Used in 18th and 19th (officially 1779–1871) century Japanese maps. Exact place unknown, but in "Kairekisyo" in Nishigekkoutyou-town in Kyoto, then the capital.
	~ 180		180th meridian	Opposite of Greenwich, proposed 13 October 1884 on the International Meridian Conference by Sandford Fleming

== See also ==
- 1st meridian east – Line of longitude
- 1st meridian west – Line of longitude
- 180th meridian – Line of longitude
- Null Island – Cartographical (only) marker at 0°N, 0°E
- Axis mundi – Earth's axis, or a Heaven-Earth connection

== Works cited ==
- Burgess, Ebenezer (1860), "Translation of the Surya-Siddhanta", Journal of the American Oriental Society (e-book), vol. 6 (published 2013), p. 185
- Dolan, Graham (2013a). "The Greenwich Meridian before the Airy Transit Circle". The Greenwich Meridian. Archived from the original on 2 May 2012.
- Dolan, Graham (2013b). "WGS84 and the Greenwich Meridian". The Greenwich Meridian. Archived from the original on 8 July 2014.
- Hooker, Brian (2006), A multitude of prime meridians, archived from the original on 26 September 2018
- Howse, Derek (1997), Greenwich Time and the Longitude, Phillip Wilson, ISBN 978-0-85667-468-6
- Norgate, Jean; Norgate, Martin (2006), "Prime meridian", Old Hampshire Mapped, archived from the original on 28 December 2021
- NGS datasheet station name form, National Geodetic Survey, 2016, archived from the original on 16 February 2016
- Sobel, Dava; Andrewes, William J. H. (1998), The Illustrated Longitude, Fourth Estate, London
