= ITRS =

ITRS may refer to:

- International Technology Roadmap for Semiconductors, an international body for guiding the semiconductor industry
- International Terrestrial Reference System, for creating earth measurement reference frames
- International Temperate Reefs Symposium, international academic conference
