= Earth orientation parameters =

Concept from geodesy

In geodesy and astrometry, earth orientation parameters (EOP) describe irregularities in the rotation of planet Earth. They are published by the International Earth Rotation and Reference Systems Service (IERS). EOP provides the rotational transform from the International Terrestrial Reference System (ITRS) to the International Celestial Reference System (ICRS), or vice versa, as a function of time.

Earth's rotational velocity is not constant over time. Any motion of mass in or on Earth causes a change in the rotation speed or a movement of the rotation axis. Small motions produce changes too small to be measured, but movements of very large mass, like sea currents, tides, and those resulting from earthquakes, can produce discernible changes in the rotation and can change very precise astronomical observations. Global simulations of atmosphere, ocean, and land dynamics are used to create effective angular momentum (EAM) functions that can be used to predict changes in EOP.

== Components ==
=== Universal time ===
Universal Time (UT, or UT1) is a time standard based on the rotation of the Earth relative to the sun. The Earth's rotation is uneven, so UT is not linear with respect to atomic time, and the length of a day (LOD) in UT varies slightly from the civil day, which is usually exactly twenty-four hours by definition (and one second longer or shorter in a day with a leap second). UT is practically proportional to sidereal time, which is also a direct measure of Earth rotation but relative to the stars, so that a sidereal day is about 23 hours and 56 minutes long. The value of UT1 can be determined using geodetic observations, such as by very-long-baseline interferometry and lunar laser ranging, whereas LOD can be derived from satellite observations, such as with Galileo, GPS, GLONASS, and satellite laser ranging to geodetic satellites. LOD varies due to gravitational effects from external bodies and geophysical processes occurring in various Earth layers, such as differences in movement of magma and mantle and climatic processes, such as El Niño, confounding LOD predictions.

=== Coordinates of the pole ===
Due to the (very slow) pole motion of the Earth, the Celestial Ephemeris Pole (CEP, or celestial pole) is not stationary on the surface of the Earth. It is calculated from observation data, and is averaged, so it differs from the instantaneous rotation axis by quasi-diurnal terms, which are as small as under 0.01″ (see). The CEP is specified relative to a static terrestrial point called the IERS Reference Pole, or IRP, in an x–y coordinate system: The x axis runs in the directions of the IERS Reference Meridian (IRM, the prime meridian of the ITRS) and the meridian of 180° longitude (respectively positive and negative), and the y axis the meridians of 90 degrees west longitude (positive) and 90° east longitude (negative). The CEP coordinates can be determined using various space geodesy and satellite geodesy techniques, e.g., satellite laser ranging and very-long-baseline interferometry; however, the most accurate techniques use global navigation satellite systems (Galileo, GPS, GLONASS).

=== Celestial pole offsets ===
Celestial pole offsets are described in the IAU models of precession and nutation. The observed differences with respect to the conventional celestial pole position defined by the models are monitored and reported by the IERS. Celestial pole offsets can only be obtained by the VLBI. The observed CPO can quantify the deficiencies of the IAU2006/2000A precession–nutation model, including the astronomically forced nutations and a component of nutation that is considered unpredictable. Some studies indicate that substantial free core nutation (FCN) amplitude and phase disturbances occurred at the epochs close to the revealed geomagnetic jerk (GMJ) events.
