= Geodetic control network =

Network of points with known positions used in geodesy and surveying

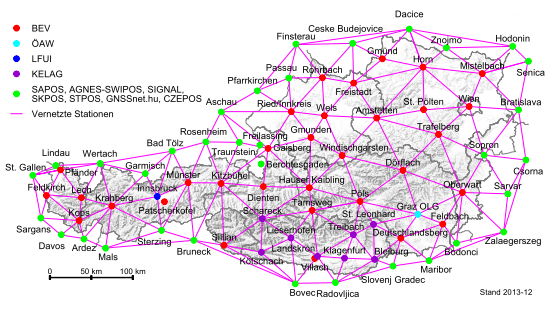
Network of reference stations used by Austrian Positioning Service (APOS)

A geodetic control network is a network, often of triangles, that are measured precisely by techniques of control surveying, such as terrestrial surveying or satellite geodesy. It is also known as a geodetic network, reference network, control point network, or simply control network.

A geodetic control network consists of geodetic markers, which are stable, identifiable points or vertices with published coordinate values derived from observations that tie the points together.

In the U.S., there is a national control network called the National Spatial Reference System (NSRS). Many organizations may contribute information to the geodetic control network. In the United Kingdom, the Ordnance Survey maintains the OS Net network.

The higher-order (high precision, usually millimeter-to-decimeter on a scale of continents) control points are normally defined in both space and time using global or space techniques, and are used for "lower-order" points to be tied into. The lower-order control points are normally used for engineering, construction and navigation. The scientific discipline that deals with the establishing of coordinates of points in a control network is called geodesy.

== Applications ==
=== Cartography ===
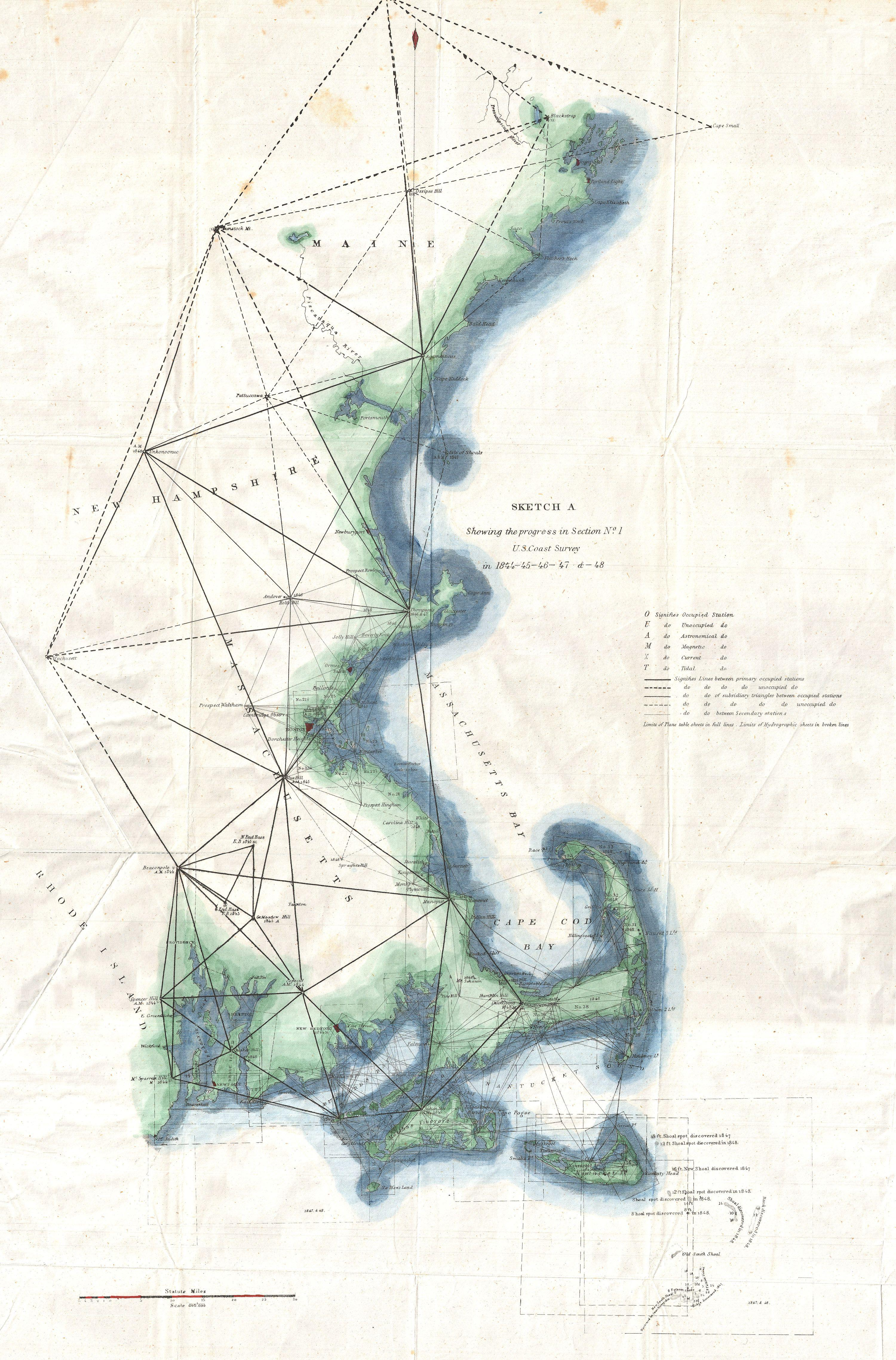
Example of triangle network and its application in cartography

After a cartographer registers key points in a digital map to the real world coordinates of those points on the ground, the map is then said to be "in control". Having a base map and other data in geodetic control means that they will overlay correctly.

When map layers are not in control, it requires extra work to adjust them to line up, which introduces additional error. Those real world coordinates are generally in some particular map projection, unit, and geodetic datum.

=== Construction and engineering ===
Survey control networks are used for different phases of engineering and construction. Applications, according to the Chartered Institution of Civil Engineering Surveyors, include:

- capturing topographic data,
- construction setting-out,
- as-built verification,
- infrastructure maintenance, and
- deformation monitoring.

An example application is the accurate and robust positioning of tunnel boring machines.

== Measurement techniques ==
=== Terrestrial techniques ===
==== Triangulation ====
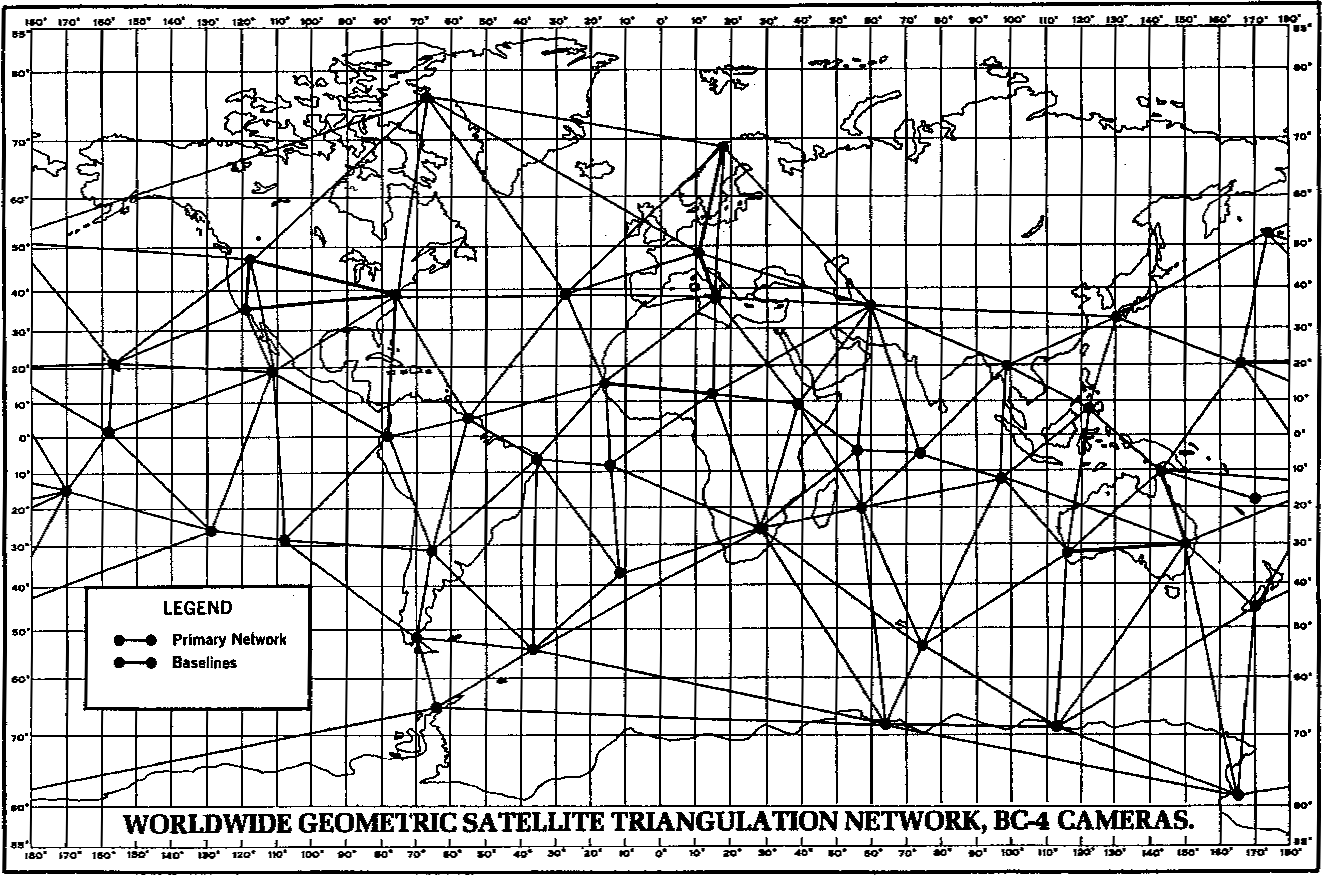
Worldwide BC-4 camera geometric satellite triangulation network

In "classical geodesy" (up to the sixties) control networks were established by triangulation using measurements of angles and of some spare distances. The precise orientation to the geographic north is achieved through methods of geodetic astronomy. The principal instruments used are theodolites and tacheometers, which nowadays are equipped with infrared distance measuring, data bases, communication systems and partly by satellite links.

==== Trilateration ====
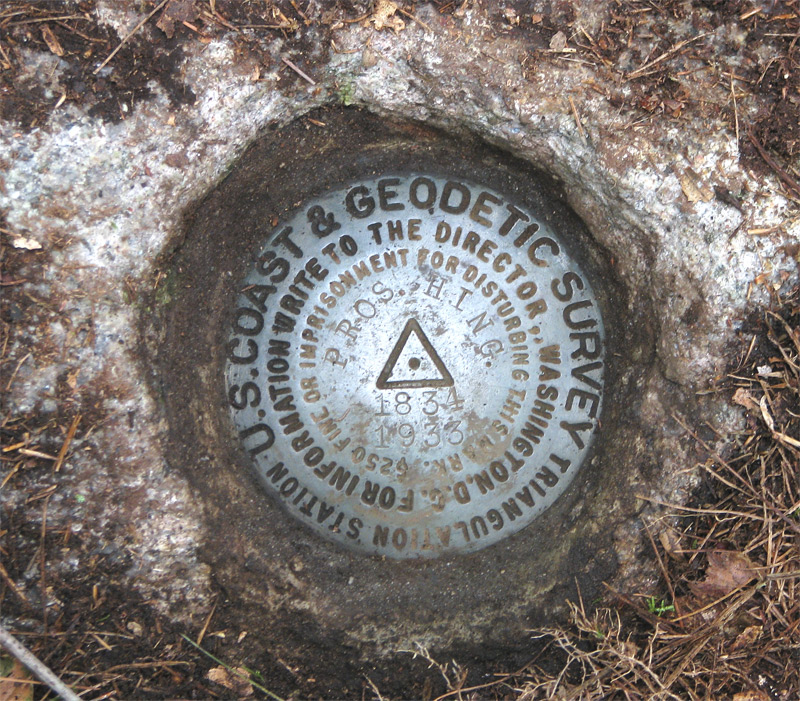
Control point marker placed by the US Coast and Geodetic Survey

Electronic distance measurement (EDM) was introduced around 1960, when the prototype instruments became small enough to be used in the field. Instead of using only sparse and much less accurate distance measurements some control networks were established or updated by using trilateration more accurate distance measurements than was previously possible and no angle measurements.

EDM increased network accuracies up to 1:1 million (1 cm per 10 km; today at least 10 times better), and made surveying less costly.

==== Levelling ====
Optical levelling, which determines relative height difference between two points, can be used to determine the vertical component of control networks, particularly relative to fixed datums (such as that employed for Ordnance Datum Newlyn). Double run level techniques may be employed to minimise error.

=== Satellite geodesy ===
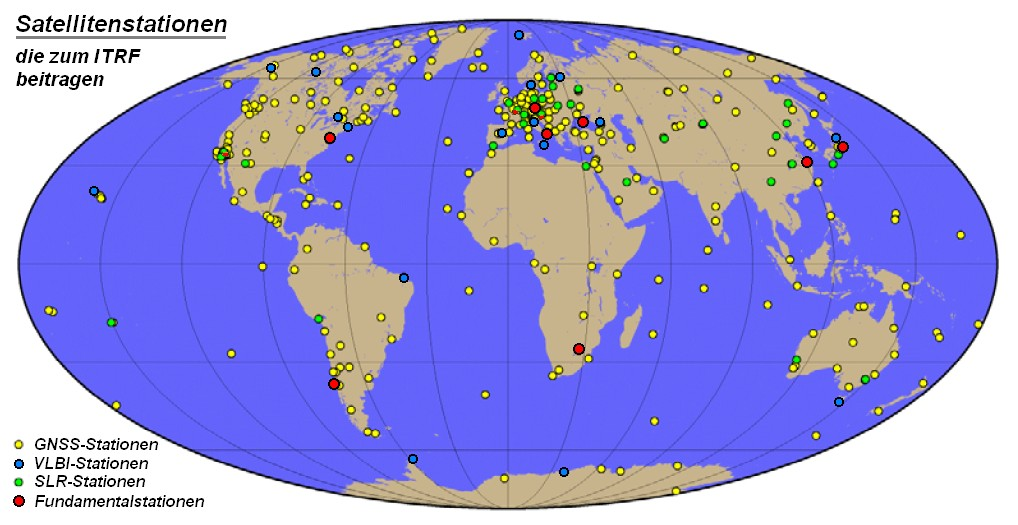
International Terrestrial Reference System (ITRF) reference stations

The geodetic use of satellites began around the same time. By using bright satellites like Echo I, Echo II and Pageos, global networks were determined, which later provided support for the theory of plate tectonics.

Another important improvement was the introduction of radio and electronic satellites like Geos A and B (1965–70), of the Transit system (Doppler effect) 1967-1990 — which was the predecessor of GPS - and of laser techniques like LAGEOS (USA, Italy) or Starlette (France). Despite the use of spacecraft, small networks for cadastral and technical projects are mainly measured terrestrially, but in many cases incorporated in national and global networks by satellite geodesy.

==== Global navigation satellite systems (GNSS) ====
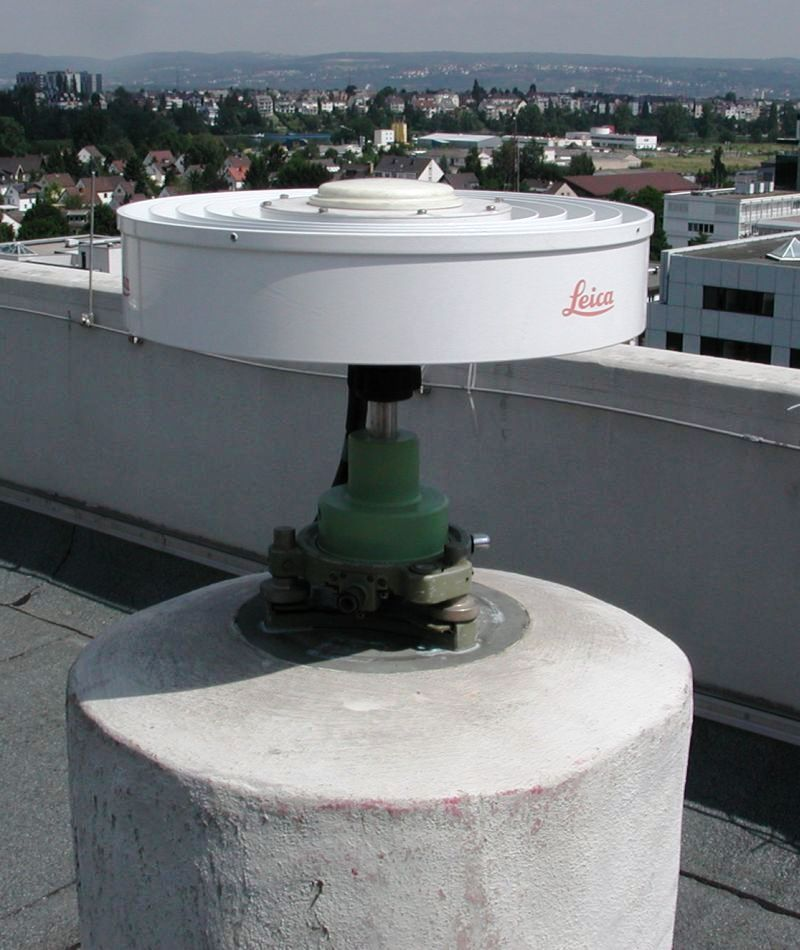
Typical GNSS reference station

Nowadays, several hundred geospatial satellites are in orbit, including a large number of remote sensing satellites and navigation systems like GPS and Glonass, which was followed by the European Galileo satellites in 2020 and China's Beidou constellation.

While these developments have made satellite-based geodetic network surveying more flexible and cost effective than its terrestrial equivalent for areas free of tree canopy or urban canyons, the continued existence of fixed point networks is still needed for administrative and legal purposes on local and regional scales. Global geodetic networks cannot be defined to be fixed, since geodynamics are continuously changing the position of all continents by 2 to 20 cm per year. Therefore, modern global networks like ETRS89 or ITRF show not only coordinates of their "fixed points", but also their annual velocities.

== See also ==
- Cadastre
- Map
- ED50
- Geodetic datum
- GRS80
- History of geodesy
- Survey marker
- Triangulation station
- Trigonometry
