= International Celestial Reference System and its realizations =

Current standard celestial reference system and frame

The International Celestial Reference System (ICRS) is the current standard celestial reference system adopted by the International Astronomical Union (IAU). Its origin is at the barycenter of the Solar System, with axes that are intended to "show no global rotation with respect to a set of distant extragalactic objects". The coordinates are basically the declination and right ascension based on the mean celestial equator and mean celestial equinox at the J2000 epoch.

The International Celestial Reference Frame (ICRF) is a realization of the International Celestial Reference System using reference celestial sources observed at radio wavelengths. In the context of the ICRS, a reference frame (RF) is the physical realization of a reference system, i.e., the reference frame is the set of numerical coordinates of the reference sources, derived using the procedures spelled out by the ICRS.

More specifically, the ICRF is an inertial barycentric reference frame whose axes are defined by the measured positions of extragalactic sources (mainly quasars) observed using very-long-baseline interferometry while the Gaia-CRF is an inertial barycentric reference frame defined by optically measured positions of extragalactic sources by the Gaia satellite and whose axes are rotated to conform to the ICRF. Although general relativity implies that there are no true inertial frames around gravitating bodies, these reference frames are important because they do not exhibit any measurable angular rotation since the extragalactic sources used to define the ICRF and the Gaia-CRF are extremely far away. The ICRF and the Gaia-CRF are now the standard reference frames used to define the positions of astronomical objects.

== Reference systems and frames ==
It is useful to distinguish reference systems and reference frames. A reference frame has been defined as "a catalogue of the adopted coordinates of a set of reference objects that serves to define, or realize, a particular coordinate frame". A reference system is a broader concept, encompassing "the totality of procedures, models and constants that are required for the use of one or more reference frames".

== Realizations ==
The ICRF is based on hundreds of extra-galactic radio sources, mostly quasars, distributed around the entire sky. Because they are so distant, they are apparently stationary to our current technology, yet their positions can be measured very accurately by Very Long Baseline Interferometry (VLBI). The positions of most are known to 1 milliarcsecond (mas) or better.

In August 1997, the International Astronomical Union resolved in Resolution B2 of its XXIIIrd General Assembly "that the Hipparcos Catalogue shall be the primary realization of the ICRS at optical wavelengths." The Hipparcos Celestial Reference Frame (HCRF) is based on a subset of about 100,000 stars in the Hipparcos Catalogue. In August 2021 the International Astronomical Union decided in Resolution B3 of its XXXIst General Assembly "that as from 1 January 2022, the fundamental realization of the International Celestial Reference System (ICRS) shall comprise the Third Realization of the International Celestial Reference Frame (ICRF3) for the radio domain and the Gaia-CRF3 for the optical domain."

=== Radio wavelengths (ICRF) ===
==== ICRF1 ====
The ICRF, now called ICRF1, was adopted by the International Astronomical Union (IAU) as of 1 January 1998. ICRF1 was oriented to the axes of the ICRS, which reflected the prior astronomical reference frame The Fifth Fundamental Catalog (FK5). It had an angular noise floor of approximately 250 microarcseconds (μas) and a reference axis stability of approximately 20 μas; this was an order-of-magnitude improvement over the previous reference frame derived from (FK5). The ICRF1 contains 212 defining sources and also contains positions of 396 additional non-defining sources for reference. The positions of these sources have been adjusted in later extensions to the catalogue. ICRF1 agrees with the orientation of the Fifth Fundamental Catalog (FK5) "J2000.0" frame to within the (lower) precision of the latter.

==== ICRF2 ====
An updated reference frame ICRF2 was created in 2009. The update was a joint collaboration of the International Astronomical Union, the International Earth Rotation and Reference Systems Service, and the International VLBI Service for Geodesy and Astrometry. ICRF2 is defined by the position of 295 compact radio sources (97 of which also define ICRF1). Alignment of ICRF2 with ICRF1-Ext2, the second extension of ICRF1, was made with 138 sources common to both reference frames. Including non-defining sources, it comprises 3414 sources measured using very-long-baseline interferometry. The ICRF2 has a noise floor of approximately 40 μas and an axis stability of approximately 10 μas. Maintenance of the ICRF2 will be accomplished by a set of 295 sources that have especially good positional stability and unambiguous spatial structure.

The data used to derive the reference frame come from approximately 30 years of VLBI observations, from 1979 to 2009. Radio observations in both the S-band (2.3 GHz) and X-band (8.4 GHz) were recorded simultaneously to allow correction for ionospheric effects. The observations resulted in about 6.5 million group-delay measurements among pairs of telescopes. The group delays were processed with software that takes into account atmospheric and geophysical processes. The positions of the reference sources were treated as unknowns to be solved for by minimizing the mean squared error across group-delay measurements. The solution was constrained to be consistent with the International Terrestrial Reference Frame (ITRF2008) and earth orientation parameters (EOP) systems.

==== ICRF3 ====
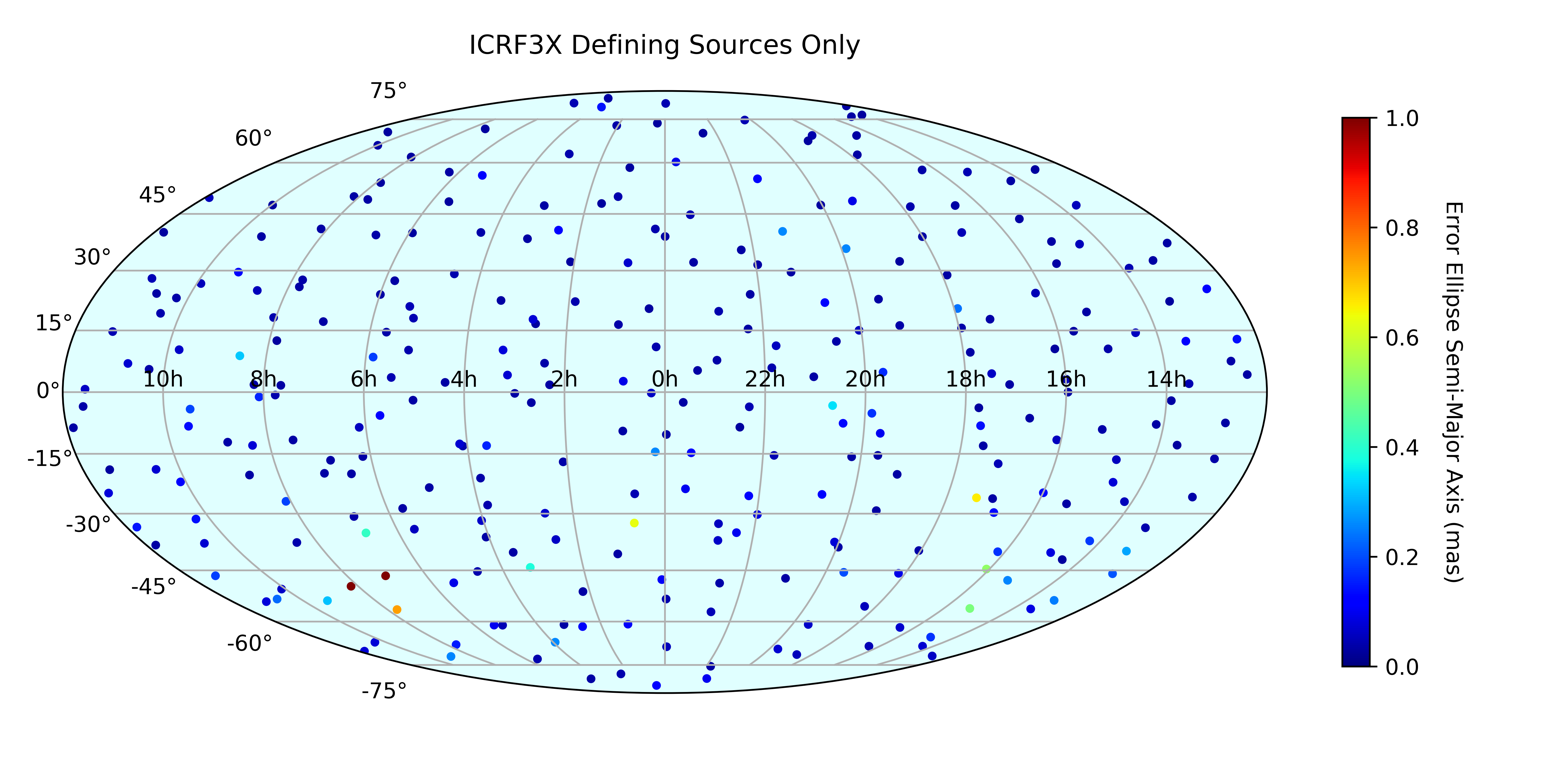
Sky distribution of the 303 "defining sources" in the ICRF3

ICRF3 is the third major revision of the ICRF, and was adopted by the IAU in August 2018 and became effective 1 January 2019. The modeling incorporates the effect of the galactocentric acceleration of the solar system, a new feature over and above ICRF2. ICRF3 also includes measurements at three frequency bands, providing three independent, and slightly different, realizations of the ICRS: dual frequency measurements at 8.4 GHz (X band) and 2.3 GHz (S band) for 4536 sources; measurements of 824 sources at 24 GHz (K band), and dual frequency measurements at 32 GHz (Ka band) and 8.4 GHz (X band) for 678 sources. Of these, 303 sources, uniformly distributed on the sky, are identified as "defining sources" which fix the axes of the frame. ICRF3 also increases the number of defining sources in the southern sky.

=== Optical wavelengths ===
==== Hipparcos Celestial Reference Frame (HCRF) ====
In 1991 the International Astronomical Union recommended "that observing programmes be undertaken or continued in order to ... determine the relationship between catalogues of extragalactic source positions and ... the [stars of the] FK5 and Hipparcos catalogues." Using a variety of linking techniques, the coordinate axes defined by the Hipparcos catalogue were aligned with the extragalactic radio frame. In August 1997, the International Astronomical Union recognized in Resolution B2 of its XXIIIrd General Assembly "That the Hipparcos Catalogue was finalized in 1996 and that its coordinate frame is aligned to that of the frame of the extragalactic sources [ICRF1] with one sigma uncertainties of ±0.6 milliarcseconds (mas)" and resolved "that the Hipparcos Catalogue shall be the primary realization of the ICRS at optical wavelengths."

==== Second Gaia celestial reference frame (Gaia–CRF2) ====
The second Gaia celestial reference frame (Gaia–CRF2), based on 22 months of observations of over half a million extragalactic sources by the Gaia spacecraft, appeared in 2018 and has been described as "the first full-fledged optical realisation of the ICRS, that is to say, an optical reference frame built only on extragalactic sources." The axes of Gaia-CRF2 were aligned to a prototype version of the forthcoming ICRF3 using 2820 objects common to Gaia-CRF2 and to the ICRF3 prototype.

==== Third Gaia celestial reference frame (Gaia–CRF3) ====
The third Gaia celestial reference frame (Gaia–CRF3) is based on 33 months of observations of 1,614,173 extragalactic sources. As with the earlier Hipparcos and Gaia reference frames, the axes of Gaia-CRF3 were aligned to 3142 optical counterparts of ICRF-3 in the S/X frequency bands. In August 2021 the International Astronomical Union noted that the Gaia-CRF3 had "largely superseded the Hipparcos Catalogue" and was "de facto the optical realization of the Celestial Reference Frame within the astronomical community." Consequently, the IAU decided that Gaia-CRF3 shall be "the fundamental realization of the International Celestial Reference System (ICRS) ... for the optical domain."

== See also ==
- Astrometry
- Astronomy
- Barycentric and geocentric celestial reference systems
- International Terrestrial Reference System and Frame
