= Meridian of Antwerp =

One of the prime meridians

The meridian of Antwerp is one of several prime meridians that have been used for geographic referencing. It runs through the city of Antwerp, in Flanders, Belgium, and formed the 0° longitude upon which some Belgian maps were based.

This city is also where Abraham Ortelius published the first modern atlas, Theatrum Orbis Terrarum, first printed in 1570.

The meridian of Antwerp is listed in the Prutenic Tables, primarily as a reference for calculating and recording eclipses from 1554 to 1576.
