= IERS Reference Meridian =

International prime meridian used for GPS and other systems

Modern IERS Reference Meridian on Earth (interactive map)

Countries that touch the Equator (red) and that touch the Prime Meridian (blue)

The IERS Reference Meridian (IRM), also called the International Reference Meridian, is the prime meridian (0° longitude) maintained by the International Earth Rotation and Reference Systems Service (IERS). It passes about 5.3 arcseconds east of George Biddell Airy's 1851 transit circle, and thus it differs slightly from the historical Greenwich Meridian. At the latitude of the Royal Observatory, Greenwich, the difference is 102 metres (335 ft). (Note: The astronomic latitude of the Royal Observatory is 51°28′38″N whereas its latitude on the European Terrestrial Reference Frame (1989) datum is 51°28′40.1247″N.)

It is the reference meridian of the Global Positioning System (GPS) operated by the United States Space Force, and of WGS 84 and its two formal versions, the ideal International Terrestrial Reference System (ITRS) and its realization, the International Terrestrial Reference Frame (ITRF).

== Location ==
The most important reason for the 5.3 seconds of longitude offset between the IERS Reference Meridian and the Airy transit circle is that the observations with the transit circle were based on the astronomical longitude, while the IERS Reference is a geodetic-based longitude; that is, the plane of the meridian contains the center of figure of the Earth. Their difference is caused by the east-west component of the vertical deflection, between the local gravity vertical direction and the ellipsoidal normal.

The International Hydrographic Organization adopted an early version of the IRM in 1983 for all nautical charts. It was adopted for air navigation by the International Civil Aviation Organization on 3 March 1989. Tectonic plates slowly move over the surface of Earth, so most countries have adopted for their maps an IRM version fixed relative to their own tectonic plate as it existed at the beginning of a specific year. Examples include the North American Datum 1983 (NAD83), the European Terrestrial Reference Frame 1989 (ETRF89), and the Geocentric Datum of Australia 1994 (GDA94). Versions fixed to a tectonic plate differ from the global version by at most a few centimetres.

The IERS system is not quite fixed to any point attached to the Earth. For example, all points on the European portion of the Eurasian plate, including the Royal Observatory, are moving northeast at about 2.5 cm per year relative to it. The IRM is the weighted average (in the least squares sense) of the reference meridians of the hundreds of ground stations contributing to the IERS network. The network includes GPS/GNSS stations, satellite laser ranging (SLR) stations, lunar laser ranging (LLR) stations, and the highly accurate very long baseline interferometry (VLBI) stations. All stations' coordinates are reduced to a reference epoch (a fixed date/time) and adjusted annually to remove net rotation relative to the major tectonic plates. If Earth had only two hemispherical plates moving relative to each other around any axis which intersects their centres or their junction, then the longitudes (around any other rotation axis) of any two, diametrically opposite, stations must move in opposite directions by the same amount.

The 180th meridian (the meridian at 180° both east and west of the Prime Meridian) is opposite the IERS Reference Meridian and forms a great ellipse with it, dividing the earth into the Western Hemisphere and the Eastern Hemisphere.

Universal Time is notionally based on the IERS Reference Meridian. Because of irregular changes in the rate of Earth's rotation, UTC can differ slightly from the mean solar time at the prime meridian, which is based on Earth's angular position relative to the Sun. From 1972 to 2016, IERS was responsible for the insertion of leap seconds into UTC from time to time, to keep it and UT1 within 1 second of each other, but this practice ended after 2026 because of the significant disruption that leap seconds caused to servers and digital systems worldwide.

== List of places ==
Starting at the North Pole and heading south to the South Pole, the IERS Reference Meridian passes through eight countries and three oceans (Arctic Ocean, Atlantic Ocean and Southern Ocean):

Co-ordinates (approximate)	Country, territory or sea	Notes
90°0′N 0°0′E	Arctic Ocean	
85°46′N 0°0′E	Exclusive Economic Zone (EEZ) of Greenland (Denmark)	
81°39′N 0°0′E	Greenland Sea	
80°29′N 0°0′E	EEZ of Svalbard (Norway)	
76°11′N 0°0′E	International waters	
73°44′N 0°0′E	EEZ of Jan Mayen (Norway)	
72°53′N 0°0′E	Norwegian Sea	
69°7′N 0°0′E	International waters	
64°42′N 0°0′E	EEZ of Norway	
63°29′N 0°0′E	EEZ of Great Britain	
61°0′N 0°0′E	North Sea	
53°46′N 0°0′E	United Kingdom	From Tunstall, East Riding of Yorkshire to Peacehaven in East Sussex, passing through Greenwich
50°47′N 0°0′E	English Channel	EEZ of Great Britain
50°14′N 0°0′E	English Channel	EEZ of France
49°20′N 0°0′E	France	From Villers-sur-Mer to Gavarnie
42°41′N 0°0′E	Spain	From Cilindro de Marboré to Castellón de la Plana
39°56′N 0°0′E	Mediterranean Sea	Gulf of Valencia; EEZ of Spain
38°52′N 0°0′E	Spain	From El Verger to Calp
38°38′N 0°0′E	Mediterranean Sea	EEZ of Spain
37°1′N 0°0′E	Mediterranean Sea	EEZ of Algeria
35°50′N 0°0′E	Algeria	From Stidia to Algeria-Mali border near Bordj Badji Mokhtar
21°52′N 0°0′E	Mali	Passing through Gao
15°00′N 0°0′E	Burkina Faso	
11°7′N 0°0′E	Togo	For about 600 m
11°6′N 0°0′E	Ghana	For about 16 km
10°58′N 0°0′E	Togo	For about 39 km
10°37′N 0°0′E	Ghana	From the Togo-Ghana border near Bunkpurugu to Tema; Passing through Lake Volta at 7°46′N 0°0′E
5°37′N 0°0′E	Atlantic Ocean	EEZ of Ghana
1°58′N 0°0′E	Atlantic Ocean	International waters
0°0′N 0°0′E	Atlantic Ocean	Passing through the Equator (see Null Island)
51°43′S 0°0′E	Atlantic Ocean	EEZ of Bouvet Island (Norway)
57°13′S 0°0′E	Atlantic Ocean	International waters
60°0′S 0°0′E	Southern Ocean	International waters
69°36′S 0°0′E	Antarctica	Queen Maud Land, claimed by Norway
90°0′S 0°0′E	Antarctica	Amundsen–Scott South Pole Station, United States South Pole

== See also ==
- 1st meridian east
- 1st meridian west
- 180th meridian
- Coordinated Universal Time
- Prime meridian
- Prime meridian (Greenwich)
