= Geocentric Datum of Australia 1994 =

Australian geodetic reference system

The Geocentric Datum of Australia 1994 (GDA94) is a geodetic datum covering the Australian continent. Details of this datum are provided by the GDA94 Technical Manual.

== History ==
The GDA94 datum was formalized in 1994, replacing the previous datums which were being used in Australia at the time, the Australian Geodetic Datum 1966 (AGD66) and the Australian Geodetic Datum 1984 (AGD84).

Prior to 1966, maps in Australia were produced in miles using the Australian National Grid.

== Map Grid of Australia 1994 ==
At the same time as GDA94 was defined, a Universal Transverse Mercator coordinate system called the Map Grid of Australia 1994 (MGA94) was also defined to replace the existing Australian Map Grid (AMG). This new map grid used the GDA94 datum and the GRS80 ellipsoid.

== Relation to other datums ==
For many users, GDA94 can be treated as being the same as the World Geodetic System 1984 (WGS84). However, where high accuracy is required, one must take into account that GDA94 is a static datum. GDA94 moves with the Australian continental plate. It is ITRF92 (using epoch 1994.0) and thus close to the WGS84 (G730) datum back in 1994, but since then has drifted at the rate of approximately 7 cm north east per year with a slight rotation. In 2000, the difference was approximately 45 cm. It is predicted that by 2020, the difference will be around 1.8 m. GDA2020 is based on a realisation of the ITRF2014 at epoch 2020.0, or 1 January 2020.

== Modernisation ==
The Intergovernmental Committee on Surveying and Mapping (ICSM) has proposed a two-stage plan to update the datum, given a working title of GDA2020.
