= Ferro meridian =

Historical prime meridian associated with El Hierro, Canary Islands

17.662783th meridian west (interactive map)

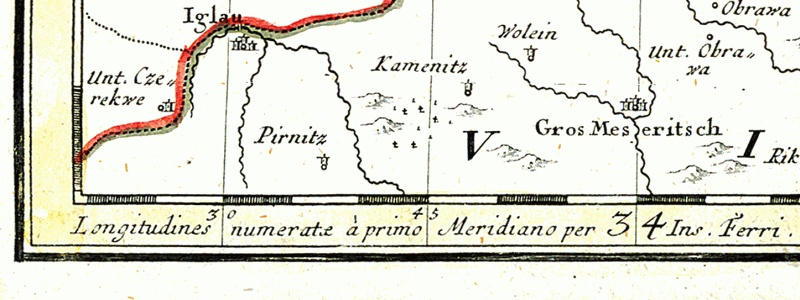
Part of map of Upper Silesia (1746) with Latin message: Longitudines numeratæ à primo Meridiano per Ins(ulam) Ferri

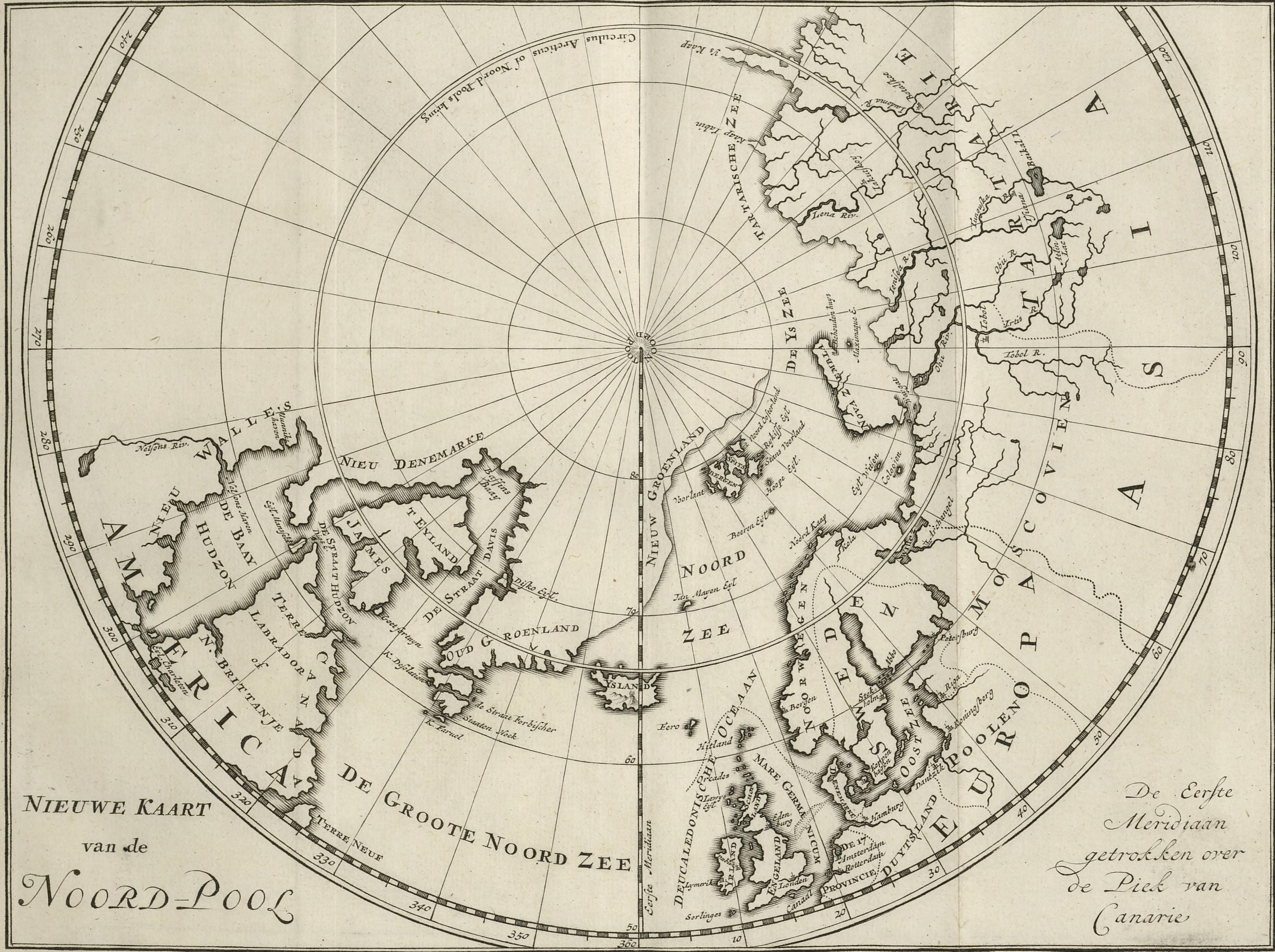
Dutch map from 1720 over the North Pole with the Ferro Meridian.

The Ferro meridian was a historical prime meridian named after and associated with the island of El Hierro (Ferro), the westernmost of the Canary Islands.

Already in the 2nd century A.D., Ptolemy considered a definition of the zero meridian based on the westernmost position of the known world, giving maps with only positive (eastern) longitudes. In 1634, France ruled by Louis XIII and Cardinal Richelieu decided that Ferro's meridian should be used as the reference on maps, since this island was considered the most western position of the Old World. Flores Island lies further west, but the Azores were not discovered by Europeans until the early 15th century, and their identification as part of the Old World is uncertain. It was thought to be exactly 20 degrees west of the Paris meridian, so indeed the exact position of Ferro was never considered. Old maps (outside of Anglo-America) often have a common grid with Paris degrees at the top and Ferro degrees offset by 20 at the bottom. Louis Feuillée also worked on this problem in 1724.

It was later found that the actual island of El Hierro itself is in fact 20° 23' 9" west of Paris, but the Ferro meridian was still defined as 20 degrees west of Paris.

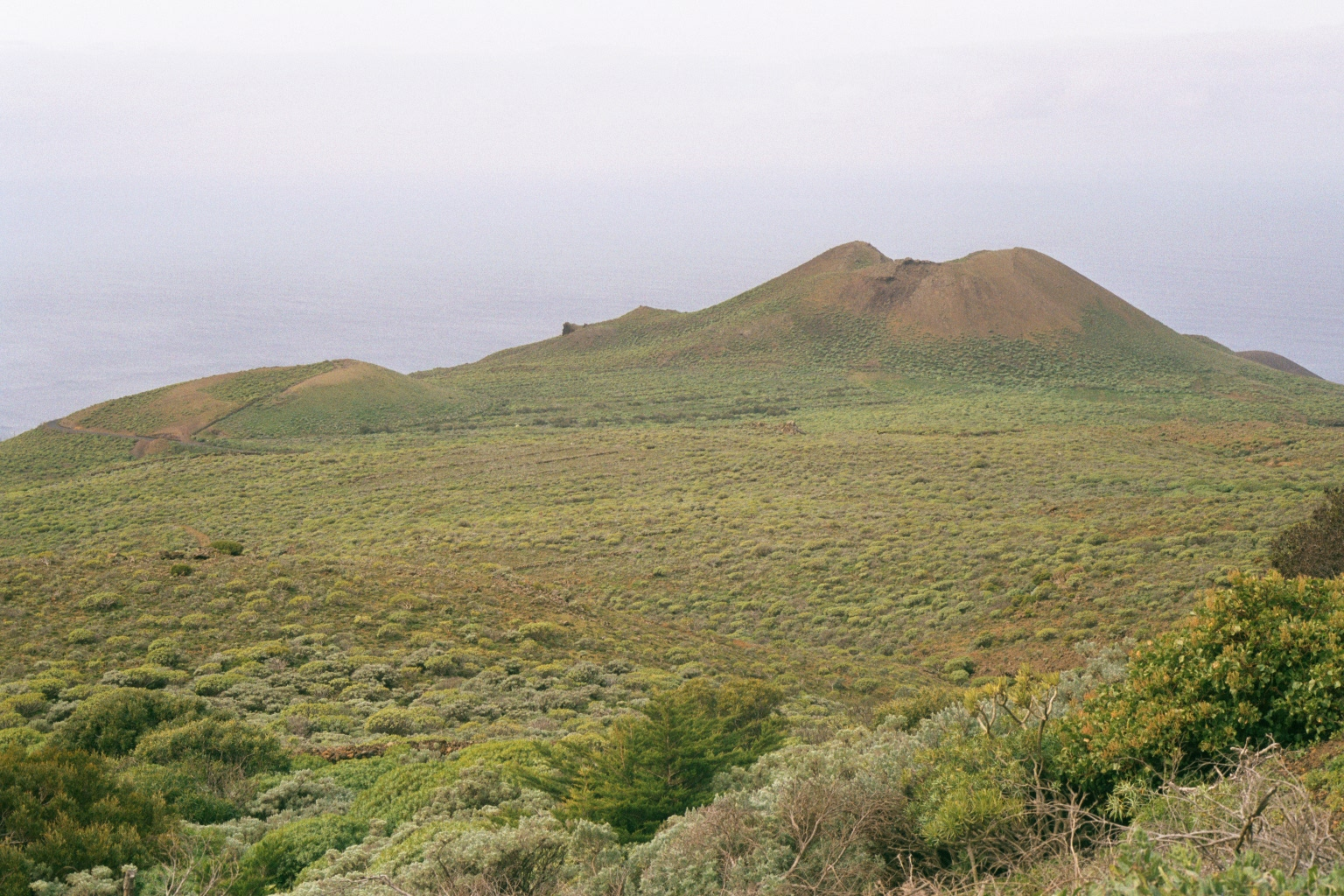
El Hierro's western end was for a long time considered the end of the known world by the Europeans

According to the European longitude adjustment of Carl Theodor Albrecht (ca. 1890) the Ferro meridian is 17° 39ʹ 46.02ʺ west of the Greenwich meridian. But for the geodetic networks of Austria, Germany and Czechoslovakia, the value 17° 40ʹ 00ʺ was adopted in the 1920s, not only for practical reasons but also as it was discovered that the longitude of the Berlin (Rauenberg) fundamental point was miscalculated by 13.39ʺ. For the geodetic networks of Hungary and Yugoslavia, the value of Albrecht was used prior to the switch to the Greenwich prime meridian.

The island of El Hierro spans more than a quarter of a degree of longitude, from Ensenada de Juanil at 17° 52ʹ 59ʺ W to Roque del Guincho at 18° 9ʹ 41ʺ W.

== See also ==
- Prime meridian
