= Bonaventura Moreno =

Spanish Navy officer

Bonaventura Moreno was a Spanish Navy officer. In 1781, he blockaded the British-held island of Menorca and soon took part in the Great Siege of Gibraltar as commander of the floating batteries. However, the Spanish and French forces were repulsed and the siege was a costly defeat for the allies.
