= PZ-90 =

Geodetic datum

PZ-90 (short for Parametry Zemli 1990 goda, in Russian: Параметры Земли 1990 года) is a geodetic datum defined for use in the GLONASS system.

== Revisions ==
=== PZ-90.02 ===
Creation date - 2005; Epoch - 2002.0; Absolute positional accuracy - from 0.3 to 0.5 m; Relative positional accuracy - from 2 to 3 cm

=== PZ-90.11 ===
Creation date - 2011; Epoch - 2010.0; Absolute positional accuracy - 5 cm; Relative positional accuracy - from 0.5 to 1 cm

PZ-90.11 is described as "closest to ITRF2000" by the ESA's Navipedia. It converts to ITRF2008 with only a shift vector; no rotation or scaling is needed.
