= 1st meridian east =

Line of longitude

1st meridian east

The meridian 1° east of Greenwich is a line of longitude that extends from the North Pole across the Arctic Ocean, the Atlantic Ocean, Europe, Africa, the Southern Ocean, and Antarctica to the South Pole.

The 1st meridian east forms a great ellipse with the 179th meridian west.

== From pole to pole ==
Starting at the North Pole and heading south to the South Pole, the 1st meridian east passes through:

Co-ordinates	Country, territory or sea	Notes
90°0′N 1°0′E	Arctic Ocean	
81°35′N 1°0′E	Atlantic Ocean	
61°0′N 1°0′E	North Sea	
52°58′N 1°0′E	United Kingdom	England, passing through Stowmarket, Suffolk (at 52°11′N 1°0′E)
51°47′N 1°0′E	North Sea	
51°21′N 1°0′E	United Kingdom	England, passing just west of Whitstable, Kent (at 51°21′N 1°1′E)
51°1′N 1°0′E	English Channel	
49°55′N 1°0′E	France	
42°47′N 1°0′E	Spain	
41°2′N 1°0′E	Mediterranean Sea	Passing just west of the island of Ibiza (at 38°54′N 1°13′E)
36°28′N 1°0′E	Algeria	
21°13′N 1°0′E	Mali	
15°0′N 1°0′E	Niger	
13°33′N 1°0′E	Burkina Faso	
13°22′N 1°0′E	Niger	A section of the border with Burkina Faso runs parallel to the meridian, about 1km to the west
13°3′N 1°0′E	Burkina Faso	
11°5′N 1°0′E	Benin	
10°13′N 1°0′E	Togo	
6°18′N 1°0′E	Ghana	
5°55′N 1°0′E	Atlantic Ocean	
60°0′S 1°0′E	Southern Ocean	
69°51′S 1°0′E	Antarctica	Queen Maud Land, claimed by Norway

== See also ==
- 2nd meridian east
- Prime meridian
