= International Earth Rotation and Reference Systems Service =

Body responsible for maintaining global time and reference frame standards

- The IERS logo
- Abbreviation: IERS
- Formation: 1987
- Type: International organization
- Headquarters: Frankfurt, Germany
- Website: www.iers.org

The International Earth Rotation and Reference Systems Service (IERS), formerly the International Earth Rotation Service, is the body responsible for maintaining global time and reference frame standards, notably through its Earth Orientation Parameter (EOP) and International Celestial Reference System (ICRS) groups.

== History ==
The IERS was established in its present form in 1987 by the International Astronomical Union and the International Union of Geodesy and Geophysics, replacing the earlier International Polar Motion Service (IPMS) and the Earth rotation section of the Bureau International de l'Heure (BIH). The service began operation on January 1, 1988. Since its inception, the IERS has established new bureaus including the GPS Coordinating Centre in 1990, the DORIS Coordinating Centre in 1994 and the Global Geophysical Fluids Centre in 1998. The organization was formerly known as International Earth Rotation Service until 2003 when it formally changed its name to its present form, in which the organization chose to retain the acronym IERS.

== Function ==
The IERS has various components located in the United States, Europe and Hong Kong. Among its other functions, the IERS is responsible for announcing leap seconds.

The Sub-bureau for Rapid Service and Predictions of Earth Orientation Parameters of the IERS, located at the United States Naval Observatory, monitors the Earth's rotation. Part of its mission involves the determination of a time scale based on the current rate of the rotation of the Earth. Other services of IERS are at the Paris Observatory.

UT1 is the non-uniform time defined based on the Earth's rotation.

It defined the IERS Reference Meridian, the International Terrestrial Reference System (ITRS), and subsequent International Terrestrial Reference Frames (ITRF). Related coordinate systems are used by satellite navigation systems like GPS and Galileo: WGS84 and GTRF. The definitions and relationships among ITRF, ICRF and EOP are established by IERS conventions standards. As of 2022, the most recent convention is the IERS Conventions (2010).

== Earth orientation products ==
A mission of the IERS is to provide earth orientation information to the greater geodesy community in the form of bulletins:

- Bulletin A provides a rapid turnaround service for providing current EOP and a prediction model for EOP up to a year in the future. It is released weekly.
- Bulletin B provides final measurements of EOP and is released monthly.
- Bulletin C provides announcements of leap seconds.
- Bulletin D provides DUT1 = (UT1 − UTC) to 0.1-second precision.

== See also ==
- Astrometry
- International Atomic Time
- Coordinated Universal Time
- International Terrestrial Reference System and Frame
- Leap second
- International Celestial Reference System and its realizations
- Earth rotation, ΔT
- IERS Reference Meridian
- List of astronomical societies
