= International Terrestrial Reference System and Frame =

World spatial reference system co-rotating with the Earth in its diurnal motion in space

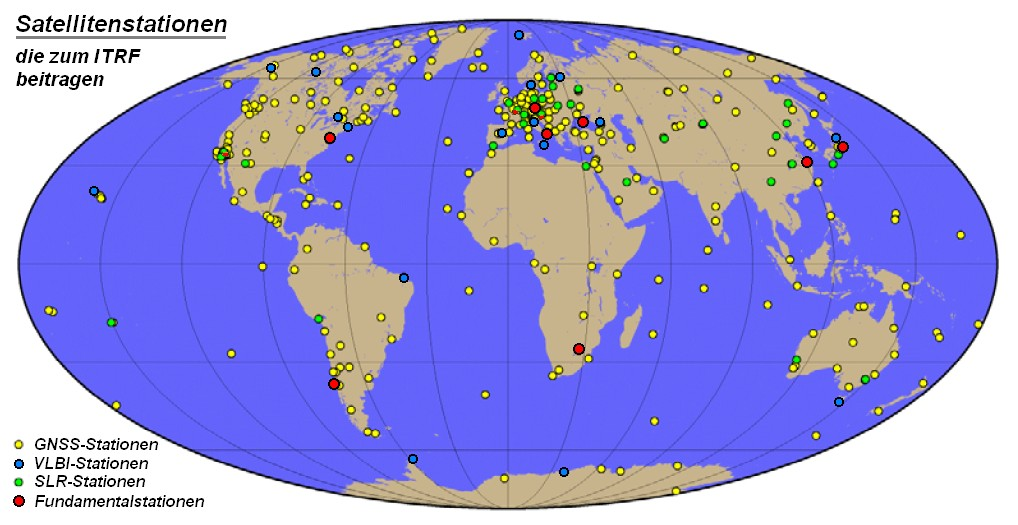
ITRF reference stations

The International Terrestrial Reference System (ITRS) describes procedures for creating reference frames suitable for use with measurements on or near the Earth's surface. This is done in much the same way that a physical standard might be described as a set of procedures for creating a realization of that standard. The ITRS defines a geocentric system of coordinates using the SI system of measurement.

An International Terrestrial Reference Frame (ITRF) is a realization of the ITRS. Its origin is at the center of mass of the whole earth including the oceans and atmosphere. New ITRF solutions are produced every few years, using the latest mathematical and surveying techniques to attempt to realize the ITRS as precisely as possible. Due to experimental error, any given ITRF will differ very slightly from any other realization of the ITRF. The difference between the latest as of 2006 WGS 84 (frame realisation G1150) and the latest ITRF2000 is only a few centimeters and RMS difference of one centimeter per component. ITRFs are Earth-centered, Earth-fixed (ECEF) reference frames.

The ITRS and ITRF solutions are maintained by the International Earth Rotation and Reference Systems Service (IERS). Practical navigation systems are in general referenced to a specific ITRF solution, or to their own coordinate systems which are then referenced to an ITRF solution. For example, the Galileo Terrestrial Reference Frame (GTRF) is used for the Galileo navigation system; currently defined as ITRF2005 by the European Space Agency.

== Versions ==
The ITRF realizations developed from the ITRS since 1991 include the following versions:

Name	Ref. epoch	EPSG code	Notes
ITRF91	1988.0	4913 7903 8991	
ITRF92	1988.0	4914 7904 8992	First realization of the ITRS
ITRF93	1988.0	4915 7905 8993	
ITRF94	1993.0	4916 7906 8994	
ITRF96	1997.0	4917 7907 8995	
ITRF97	1997.0	4918 7908 8996	
ITRF2000	1997.0	4919 7909 8997	First solution that combines unconstrained space geodesy solutions free from any tectonic plate motion model. From this version onwards, the motion of the tectonic plate is represented in the solution for each station as a velocity vector. Previous ITRFs only continued the initial positions, using a motion model to fill in the velocity.
ITRF2005	2000.0	4896 7910 8998	Constructed with input data under the form of time series of station positions and Earth Orientation Parameters. This version introduces extra parameters to describe the year-periodic motion of the stations: A (amplitude) and φ (phase) per-axis. This sort of seasonal variation has an amplitude of around 1 cm and is attributed to non-tidal loading effects (e.g. the shifting weight of water).
ITRF2008	2005.0	5332 7911 8999	Includes tropospheric modeling and improved solution methods.
ITRF2014	2010.0	7789 7912 9000	Generated with an enhanced modeling of nonlinear station motions. Specifically: a semiannual component is added to the traditional annual periodic model; smooth parametric fits are to model post-seismic deformation as opposed to the traditional approach using piecewise linear functions.
ITRF2020	2015.0	9988 9989 9990	

== Users ==
GNSS systems:

- Galileo Terrestrial Reference Frame (GTRF), ITRF2005; own implementation using IGS sites.
- GPS just uses WGS 84, ITRF2020 since January 2024 (but used many versions of WGS 84 before), a little modified with International GNSS Service (IGS) implementation, IGS20.
- BeiDou Coordinate System, China Terrestrial Reference Frame (CTRF) 2000 = ITRF97 at epoch 2000.0; own implementation.
- GLONASS PZ-90.11 is nominally its own system, but is quite close to ITRF and uses many of the same techniques.

National systems:

- United States: WGS 84 (see above); domestic use is mainly based on NAD 83 instead.
- China: CTRF 2000 per above.

The GPS reference epoch was moved from 2000.0 to 2001.0 in G1150 due to the magnitude 7.9 Denali Fault earthquake in Alaska in November 2002. Still in 2022 ITRF2020 was released, yet GPS was only using G2139 in its antennas, which was aligned to ITRF2014 (IGb14) (though at epoch 2016.0, not reference epoch 2010.0). On 7 January 2024 move to IGS20 happened, so WGS 84 is now aligned with ITRF2020, including PSD (post-seismic deformation), also called G2296.

On the other hand GLONASS is using PZ-90.11, which is close to ITRF2008 at epoch 2011.0 and is using 2010.0 epoch (that means when you use reference transformation to PZ-90.11 you will get January 2010 date).

== See also ==
- Earth-centered, Earth-fixed coordinate system
- Earth orientation parameters
- Geodetic datum
- International Celestial Reference System and its realizations
- Terrestrial reference frame
- World Geodetic System
