= United States Army Reserve Legal Command =

Support command of the U.S. Army Reserve Command

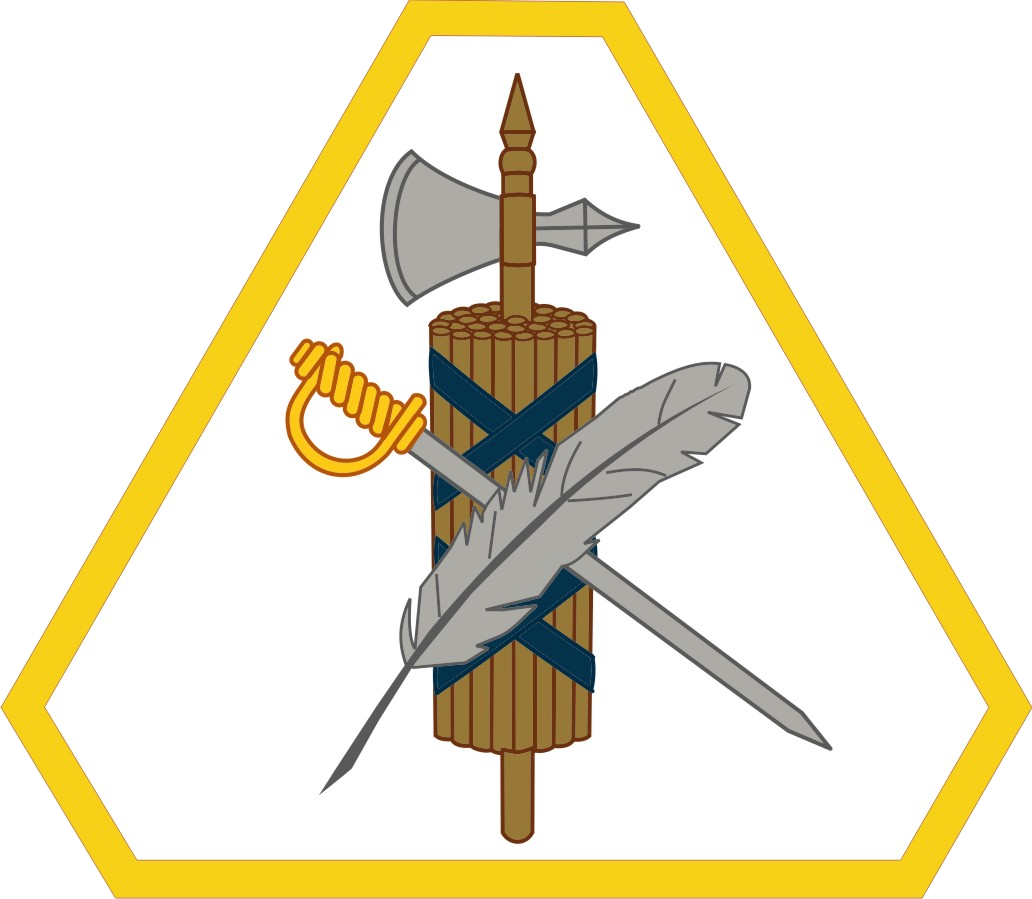
- Combat service identification badges worn by United States Army personnel assigned to the United States Army Reserve Legal Command.
- Active: 16 September 2009 – present
- Country: United States of America
- Branch: United States Army Reserve
- Part of: United States Army Reserve Command
- Garrison/HQ: MG Benjamin L. Hunton Memorial USAR Center; 8791 Snouffer School Road; Gaithersburg, Maryland, U.S. 39.179075°N 77.179173°W

Commanders
- Commanding General: Brig. Gen. Kyson M. Johnson
- Command Chief Warrant Officer: CW4 Haile M. Leaks
- Command Sergeant Major: CSM Robert E. Wood
- Notable commanders: Brigadier General Gill Beck, USA (16 September 2009 – 29 September 2011)

Insignia
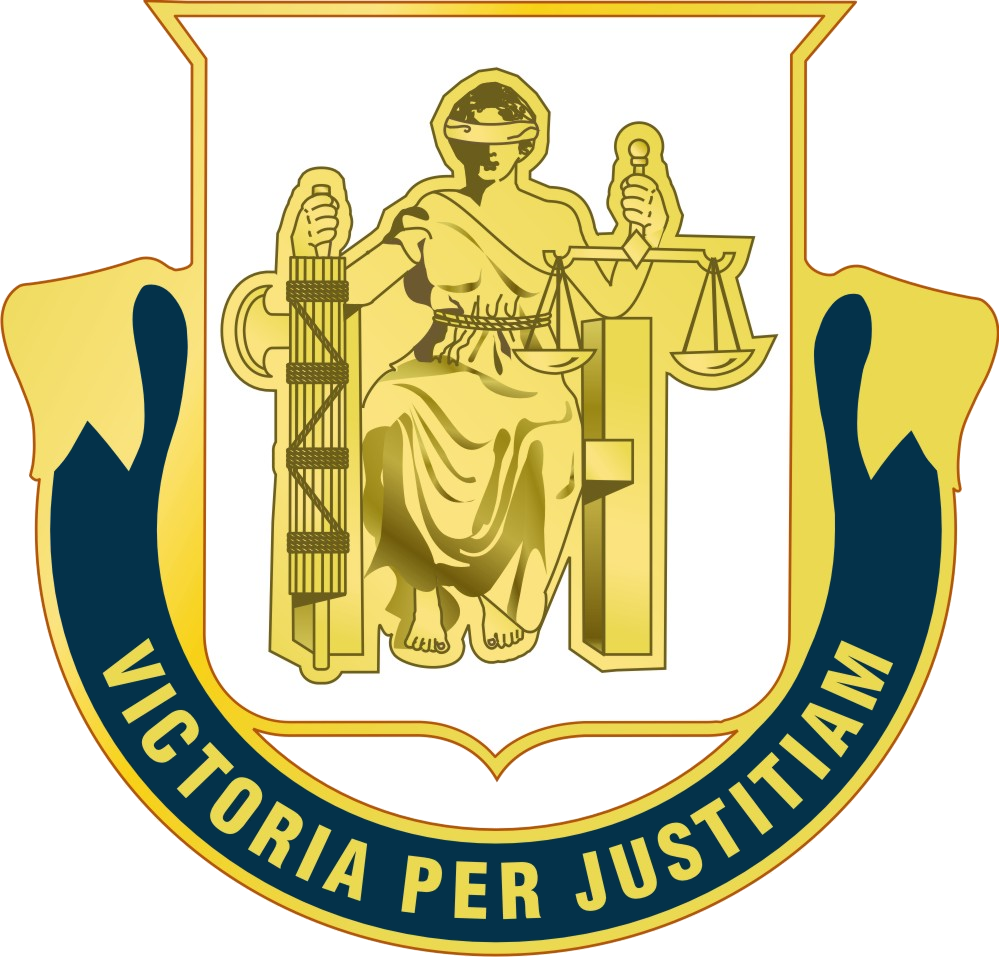
- Distinctive Unit Insignia

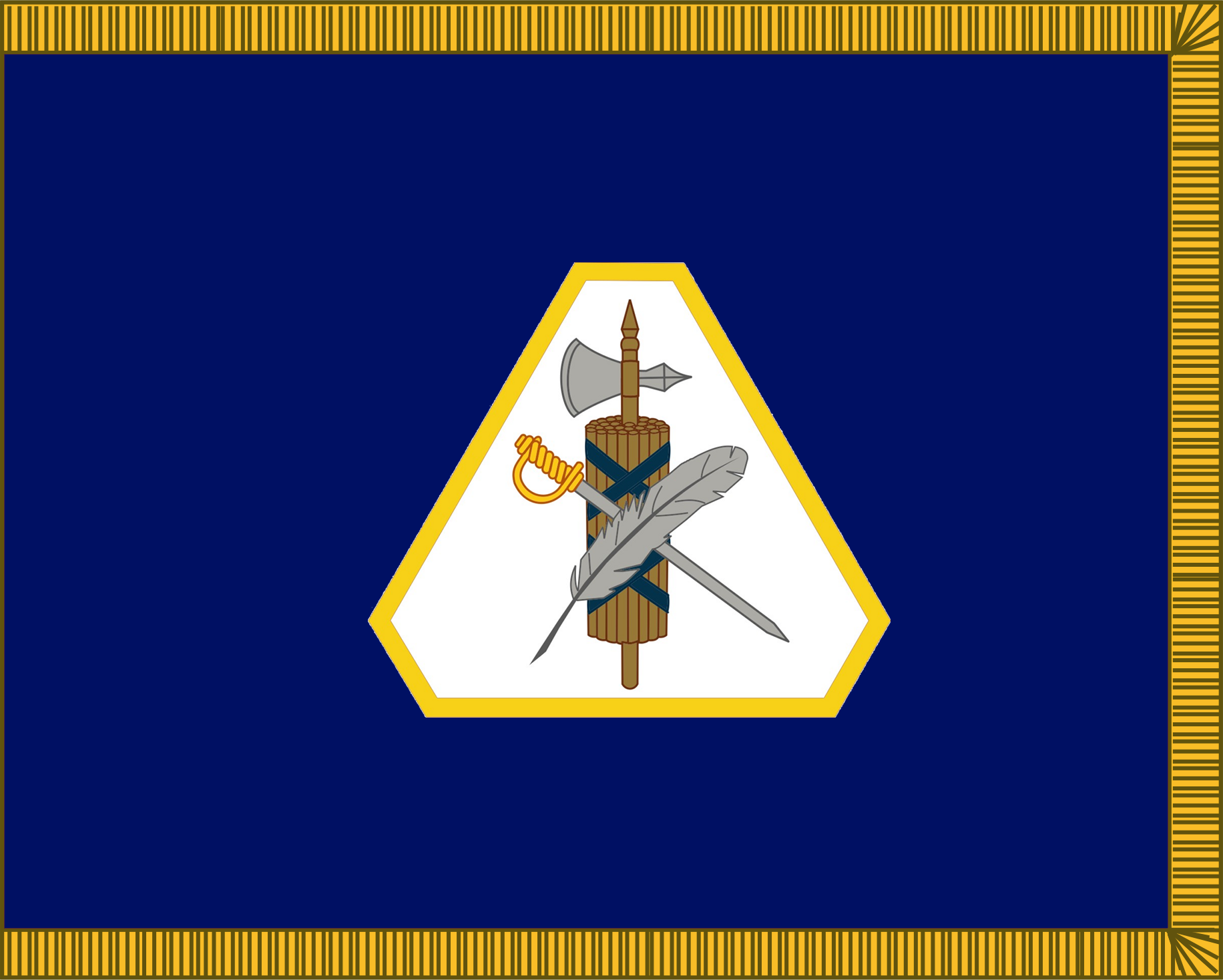
- US Army Reserve Legal Command Flag

The United States Army Reserve Legal Command (USARLC) is headquartered in Gaithersburg, Maryland, and was activated on 16 September 2009. It is part of United States Army Reserve Command.

== Mission and support ==
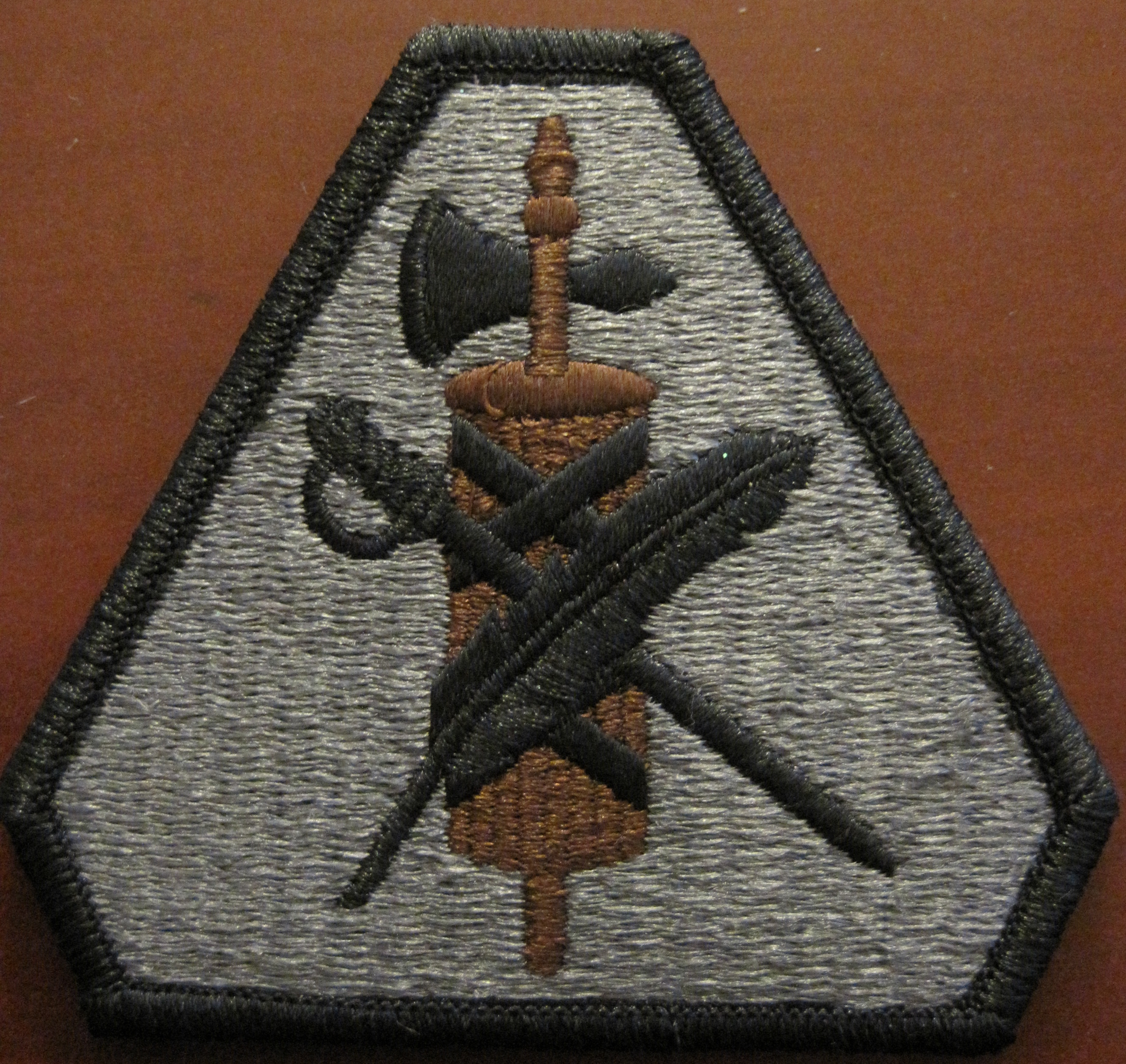
Shoulder Sleeve Insignia (SSI) worn by U.S. Army personnel assigned to the U.S. Army Reserve Legal Command.

The U.S. Army Reserve Legal Command is headquartered at the Major General Benjamin L. Hunton Memorial United States Army Reserve Center at 8791 Snouffer School Road in Gaithersburg, Maryland. The mission of the U.S. Army Reserve Legal Command (USARLC) is to ensure the availability of legal forces able to support national strategy in times of peace and war. It is composed of nearly 1,500 Soldiers and Civilians. USARLC is responsible for all of the operational tasks for the subordinate units that report to USARLC. These operational tasks include training, equipping, managing, supporting, mobilizing and retaining Soldiers under USARLC. USARLC is subordinate to the U.S. Army Reserve Command.

== Organization ==
The Army Reserve Legal Command is a subordinate functional command of the United States Army Reserve Command. As of January 2026 the command consists of 28 subordinate units located in 41 states and 104 cities including Puerto Rico. These units are called Legal Operations Detachments (LOD) and are composed of reserve judge advocates, warrant officers, paralegal non-commissioned officers, junior enlisted personnel, and civilian employees.

- US Army Reserve Legal Command, in Gaithersburg (MD)
  - 1st Judge Advocate General Legal Operations Detachment (Multifunctional), in San Antonio (TX)
    - Legal Operations Detachment, in Austin (TX)
    - Legal Operations Detachment, in Grand Prairie (TX)
    - Legal Operations Detachment, in Houston (TX)
    - Legal Operations Detachment, in Harlingen (TX)
    - Legal Operations Detachment, in Corpus Christi (TX)
    - Legal Operations Detachment, at Fort Hood (TX)
  - 2nd Judge Advocate General Legal Operations Detachment (Multifunctional), in New Orleans (LA)
    - Legal Operations Detachment, in Baton Rouge (LA)
    - Legal Operations Detachment, in Jackson (MS)
    - Legal Operations Detachment, in Laurel (MS)
  - 3rd Judge Advocate General Legal Operations Detachment (Multifunctional), in Brockton (MA)
    - Legal Operations Detachment, in Portsmouth (NH)
    - Legal Operations Detachment, in Middletown (CT)
    - Legal Operations Detachment, at Westover Air Reserve Base (MA)
  - 4th Judge Advocate General Legal Operations Detachment (Multifunctional), at Fort Totten (NY)
    - Legal Operations Detachment, at Joint Base McGuire–Dix–Lakehurst (NJ)
    - Legal Operations Detachment, in Farmingdale (NY)
    - Legal Operations Detachment, in New Windsor (NY)
  - 6th Judge Advocate General Legal Operations Detachment (Multifunctional), at Joint Base Lewis–McChord (WA)
    - Legal Operations Detachment, in Boise (ID)
    - Legal Operations Detachment, at Camp Withycombe (OR)
    - Legal Operations Detachment, at Fairchild Air Force Base (WA)
  - 7th Judge Advocate General Legal Operations Detachment (Multifunctional), in Schenectady (NY)
    - Legal Operations Detachment, in Rutland (VT)
  - 8th Judge Advocate General Legal Operations Detachment (Multifunctional), in Independence (MO)
    - Legal Operations Detachment, in Elkhorn (NE)
    - Legal Operations Detachment, in Wichita (KS)
    - Legal Operations Detachment, at Fort Leavenworth (KS)
    - Legal Operations Detachment, at Fort Des Moines (IA)
    - Legal Operations Detachment, at Fort Leonard Wood (MO)
    - Legal Operations Detachment, in St. Louis (MO)
  - 9th Judge Advocate General Legal Operations Detachment (Multifunctional), in Whitehall (OH)
    - Legal Operations Detachment, in Inkster (MI)
    - Legal Operations Detachment, in Columbus (OH)
  - 10th Judge Advocate General Legal Operations Detachment (Multifunctional), in Gaithersburg (MD)
  - 12th Judge Advocate General Legal Operations Detachment (Multifunctional), at Fort Jackson (SC)
    - Legal Operations Detachment, at Joint Base Charleston (SC)
    - Legal Operations Detachment, in Greenville (SC)
    - Legal Operations Detachment, in Gainesville (FL)
    - Legal Operations Detachment, at Fort Gordon (GA)
    - Legal Operations Detachment, at Fort Stewart (GA)
  - 13th Judge Advocate General Legal Operations Detachment (Expert), in Upper Marlboro (MD)
  - 16th Judge Advocate General Legal Operations Detachment (Trial Defense Service), at Fort Hamilton (NY)
    - Legal Operations Detachment, in Middletown (CT)
    - Legal Operations Detachment, in Boston (MA)
    - Legal Operations Detachment, in Madison (WI)
    - Legal Operations Detachment, in Charleston (WV)
    - Legal Operations Detachment, at Fort Snelling (MN)
    - Legal Operations Detachment, in Southfield (MI)
    - Legal Operations Detachment, at Joint Base McGuire–Dix–Lakehurst (NJ)
    - Legal Operations Detachment, in Columbus (OH)
    - Legal Operations Detachment, in St. Charles (MO)
    - Legal Operations Detachment, in Forest Park (IL)
    - Legal Operations Detachment, in Owings Mills (MD)
    - Legal Operations Detachment, in Hopkinsville (KY)
    - Legal Operations Detachment, in Mattydale (NY)
    - Legal Operations Detachment, in Schenectady (NY)
    - Legal Operations Detachment, in Coraopolis (PA)
    - Legal Operations Detachment, in Kaiserslautern (Germany)
  - 22nd Judge Advocate General Legal Operations Detachment (Trial Defense Service), in San Antonio (TX)
    - Legal Operations Detachment, in Santa Fe (NM)
    - Legal Operations Detachment, at Fort Huachuca (AZ)
    - Legal Operations Detachment, at Fort Carson (CO)
    - Legal Operations Detachment, at Fort Douglas (UT)
    - Legal Operations Detachment, in Mustang (OK)
    - Legal Operations Detachment, at Fort Leavenworth (KS)
    - Legal Operations Detachment, at Camp Withycombe (OR)
    - Legal Operations Detachment, at Joint Base Lewis–McChord (WA)
    - Legal Operations Detachment, at Joint Forces Training Base – Los Alamitos (CA)
    - Legal Operations Detachment, in San Diego (CA)
    - Legal Operations Detachment, in Sacramento (CA)
    - Legal Operations Detachment, in Mountain View (CA)
    - Legal Operations Detachment, at Camp Parks (CA)
    - Legal Operations Detachment, at Fort Hood (TX)
  - 75th Judge Advocate General Legal Operations Detachment (Multifunctional), in Mountain View (CA)
    - Legal Operations Detachment, at Camp Parks (CA)
    - Legal Operations Detachment, in Sacramento (CA)
    - Legal Operations Detachment, in Fresno (CA)
  - 78th Judge Advocate General Legal Operations Detachment (Multifunctional), at Joint Forces Training Base – Los Alamitos (CA)
    - Legal Operations Detachment, in San Diego (CA)
  - 87th Judge Advocate General Legal Operations Detachment (Multifunctional), in Salt Lake City (UT)
    - Legal Operations Detachment, in Pocatello (ID)
    - Legal Operations Detachment, in Aurora (CO)
    - Legal Operations Detachment, at Fort Carson (CO)
  - 91st Judge Advocate General Legal Operations Detachment (Multifunctional), in Darien (IL)
    - Legal Operations Detachment, in Davenport (IA)
    - Legal Operations Detachment, in Indianapolis (IN)
    - Legal Operations Detachment, at Camp Atterbury-Muscatatuck (IN)
  - 117th Judge Advocate General Legal Operations Detachment (Multifunctional), in Phoenix (AZ)
    - Legal Operations Detachment, in Las Vegas (NV)
    - Legal Operations Detachment, at Kirtland Air Force Base (NM)
    - Legal Operations Detachment, at Fort Huachuca (AZ)
  - 128th Judge Advocate General Legal Operations Detachment (Multifunctional), in Mustang (OK)
    - Legal Operations Detachment, in Tulsa (OK)
    - Legal Operations Detachment, at Camp Robinson (AR)
    - Legal Operations Detachment, at Fort Bliss (TX)
    - Legal Operations Detachment, in Lubbock (TX)
  - 134th Judge Advocate General Legal Operations Detachment (Multifunctional), at Fort Bragg (NC)
    - Legal Operations Detachment, in Charlotte (NC)
    - Legal Operations Detachment, in McLeansville (NC)
    - Legal Operations Detachment, in Garner (NC)
  - 139th Judge Advocate General Legal Operations Detachment (Multifunctional), in Nashville (TN)
    - Legal Operations Detachment, in Hopkinsville (KY)
    - Legal Operations Detachment, in Louisville (KY)
    - Legal Operations Detachment, in Millington (TN)
    - Legal Operations Detachment, in Knoxville (TN)
    - Legal Operations Detachment, in Chattanooga (TN)
  - 150th Judge Advocate General Legal Operations Detachment (Judges), in Alexandria (VA)
    - Legal Operations Detachment, at Fort Bragg (NC)
    - Legal Operations Detachment, at Fort Benning (GA)
    - Legal Operations Detachment, at Fort Hood (TX)
  - 151st Judge Advocate General Legal Operations Detachment (Multifunctional), in Alexandria (VA)
    - Legal Operations Detachment, at Fort Lee (VA)
    - Legal Operations Detachment, in Charlottesville (VA)
    - Legal Operations Detachment, at Joint Base Langley–Eustis (VA)
  - 153rd Judge Advocate General Legal Operations Detachment (Multifunctional), in Horsham (PA)
    - Legal Operations Detachment, in Charleston (WV)
    - Legal Operations Detachment, in New Cumberland (PA)
    - Legal Operations Detachment, in Carlisle (PA)
  - 154th Judge Advocate General Legal Operations Detachment (Trial Defense Service), in Alexandria (VA)
    - Legal Operations Detachment, at Camp Robinson (AR)
    - Legal Operations Detachment, in New Orleans (LA)
    - Legal Operations Detachment, in Nashville (TN)
    - Legal Operations Detachment, at Fort Jackson (SC)
    - Legal Operations Detachment, at Joint Base Langley–Eustis (VA)
    - Legal Operations Detachment, at Fort Bragg (NC)
    - Legal Operations Detachment, at Fort Gordon (GA)
    - Legal Operations Detachment, at Fort Benning (GA)
    - Legal Operations Detachment, in Savannah (GA)
    - Legal Operations Detachment, in Decatur (GA)
    - Legal Operations Detachment, in Orlando (FL)
    - Legal Operations Detachment, in St. Petersburg (FL)
    - Legal Operations Detachment, in Birmingham (AL)
    - Legal Operations Detachment, at Fort Buchanan (PR)
  - 174th Judge Advocate General Legal Operations Detachment (Multifunctional), in Miami (FL)
    - Legal Operations Detachment, in St. Petersburg (FL)
    - Legal Operations Detachment, at Fort Buchanan (PR)
  - 213th Judge Advocate General Legal Operations Detachment (Multifunctional), in Decatur (GA)
    - Legal Operations Detachment, at Fort Rucker (AL)
    - Legal Operations Detachment, at Redstone Arsenal (AL)
    - Legal Operations Detachment, in Montgomery (AL)
    - Legal Operations Detachment, at Fort McClellan (AL)
    - Legal Operations Detachment, at Fort Benning (GA)
    - Legal Operations Detachment, in Macon (GA)
    - Legal Operations Detachment, in Tallahassee (FL)
    - Legal Operations Detachment, at Naval Air Station Pensacola Corry Station (FL)
  - 214th Judge Advocate General Legal Operations Detachment (Multifunctional), at Fort Snelling (MN)
    - Legal Operations Detachment, at Fort McCoy (WI)
    - Legal Operations Detachment, in Madison (WI)
    - Legal Operations Detachment, in Milwaukee (WI)

== Leadership ==
Brigadier General Gerald R. Krimbill is the commanding general. The command chief warrant officer is Chief Warrant Officer Four Hector X. Colon. The senior non-commissioned officer is Command Sergeant Major Carlos V. Arrieta Jr.

== History ==
USARLC was activated on 16 September 2009. The first commanding general for USARLC was Brigadier General Gill Beck, who served from 16 September 2009 until 29 September 2011.

== See also ==
- Judge Advocate General's Corps, United States Army
