= Gaithersburg, Maryland =

City in Maryland, United States

- City
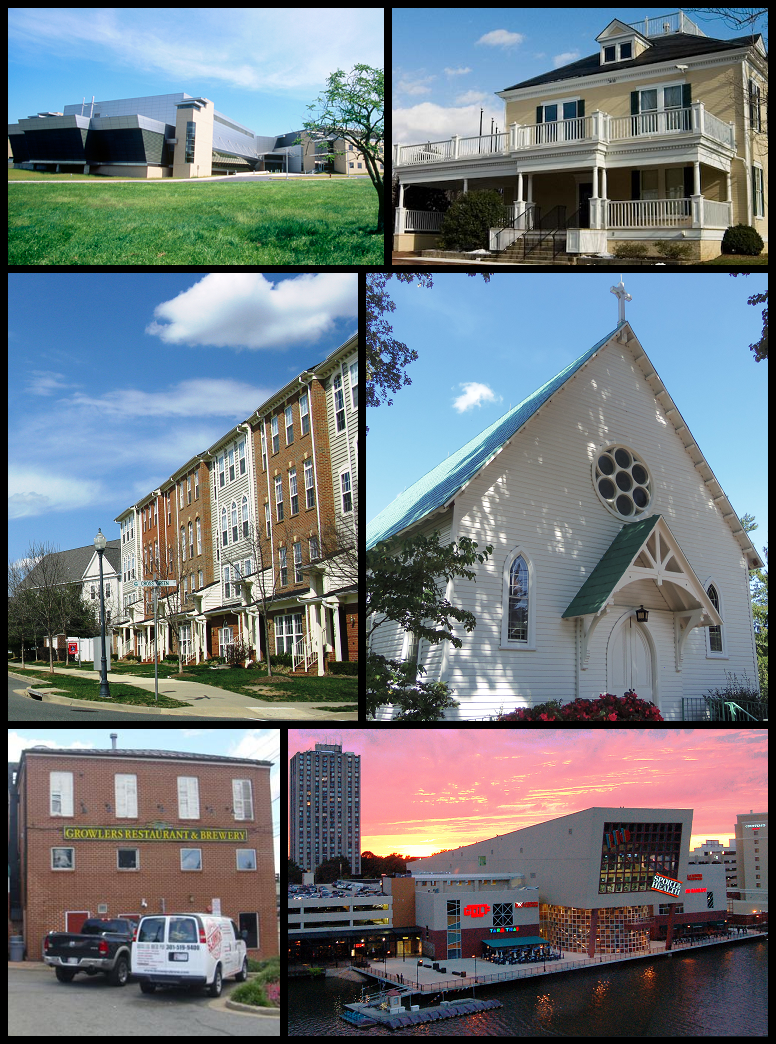
- Top to bottom, left to right: the NIST Advanced Measurement Laboratory, the Gaithersburg city hall, a row of Gaithersburg townhouses, the Saint Rose of Lima Catholic Church, the John A. Belt Building, and the RIO Washingtonian Center Waterfront

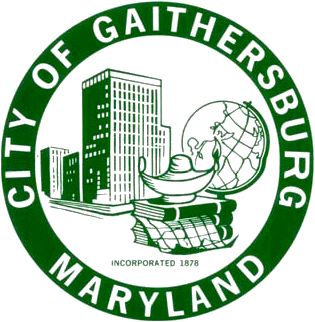
- Flag Seal Coat of arms Logo
- Nickname: "GBurg"
- Motto: "A Character Counts! city"
- Location in Montgomery County and Maryland

- Location in Maryland Gaithersburg (the United States)
- Coordinates: 39°8′32″N 77°11′36″W
- Country: United States
- State: Maryland
- County: Montgomery
- Settled (as Log Town): 1765
- Founded: 1802
- Incorporated (as a town): April 5, 1878
- Ascension (to city status): 1968
- Named for: Benjamin Gaither

Government
  - Mayor: Jud Ashman
  - Council Members: Neil Harris; Lisa Henderson; Yamil Hernández; Jim McNulty; Robert T. Wu

Area
  - Total: 10.44 sq mi (27.05 km^{2})
  - Land: 10.32 sq mi (26.73 km^{2})
  - Water: 0.12 sq mi (0.32 km^{2})
- Elevation: 350 ft (110 m)

Population (2020)
  - Total: 69,657
  - Density: 6,748.9/sq mi (2,605.78/km^{2})
- Time zone: UTC−5 (EST)
  - Summer (DST): UTC−4 (EDT)
- Area codes: 301, 240
- FIPS code: 24-31175
- GNIS feature ID: 2390591
- Website: gaithersburgmd.gov

Gaithersburg (/ˈɡeɪθərzbɜːrɡ/ GAY-thərz-burg) is a city in Montgomery County, Maryland, United States. At the time of the 2020 United States census, Gaithersburg had a population of 69,657, making it the third-largest incorporated city and the ninth-most populous community in the state. Gaithersburg is located to the northwest of Washington, D.C., and is considered a suburb and a primary city within the Washington metropolitan area. Gaithersburg was incorporated as a town in 1878 and as a city in 1968.

The National Institute of Standards and Technology (NIST) is headquartered in Gaithersburg directly west of I-270. (Note: Although NIST's mailing address states Gaithersburg, and the City of Gaithersburg surrounds NIST's property, the land where NIST is situated is not incorporated into the City of Gaithersburg. Instead, it is in an unincorporated part of Montgomery County. Owing to how land has been added to Gaithersburg over the years, there are multiple such unincorporated enclaves within the perimeter; see the City's Zoning Map for details (3MB PDF).) Other major employers in the city include IBM, Lockheed Martin Information Systems and Global Services business area headquarters, AstraZeneca. Gaithersburg is also the location of the garrison of the United States Army Reserve Legal Command.

== History ==
=== 18th century ===
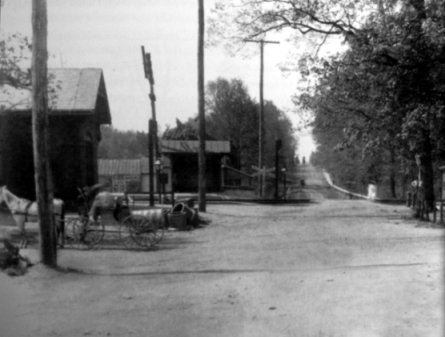
Summit Avenue in the early 1900s

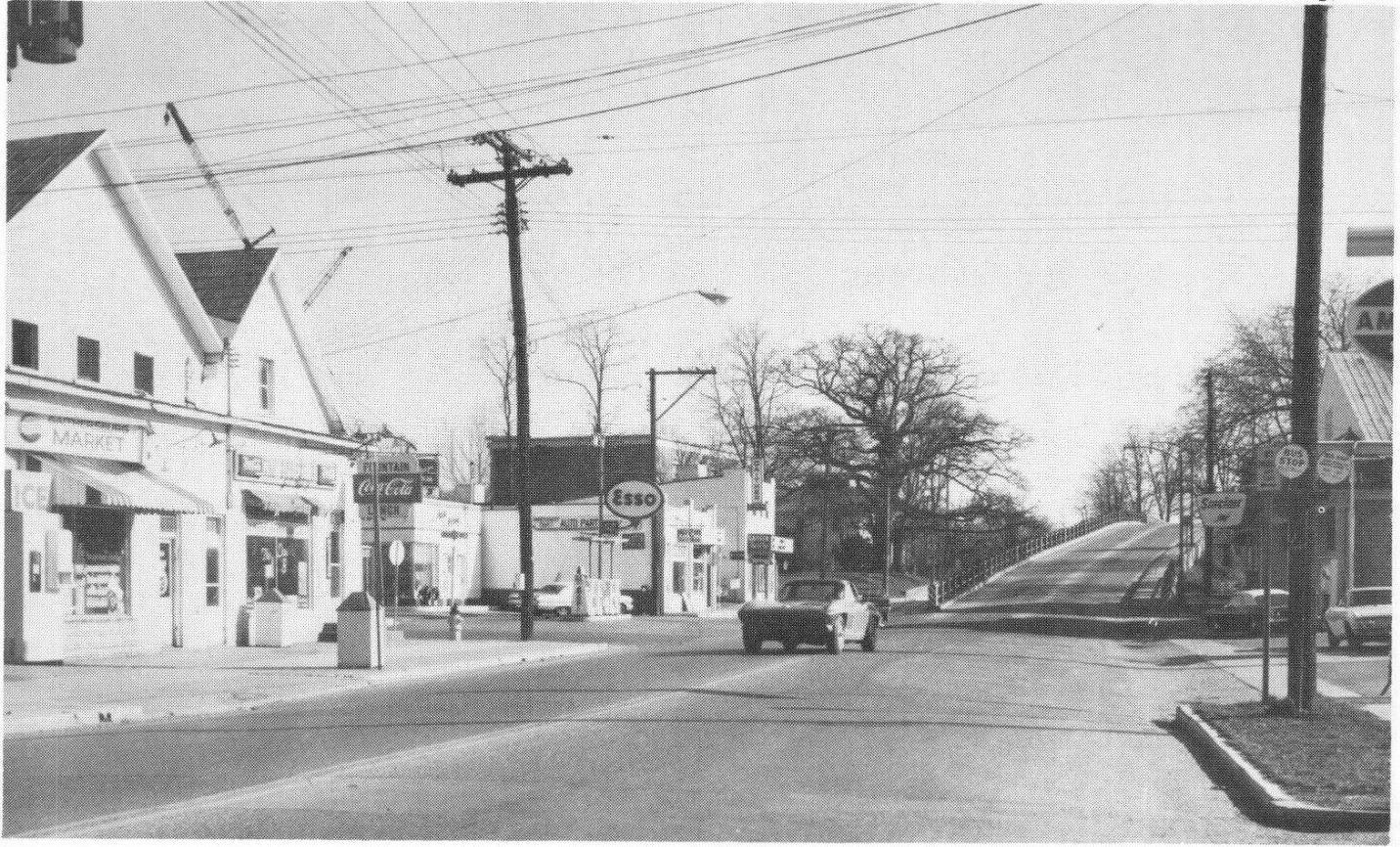
Gaithersburg's Frederick Avenue in the mid-20th century

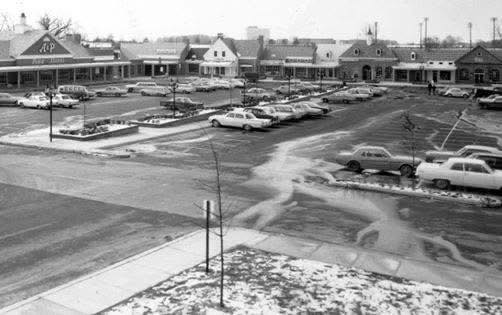
Gaithersburg in 1967

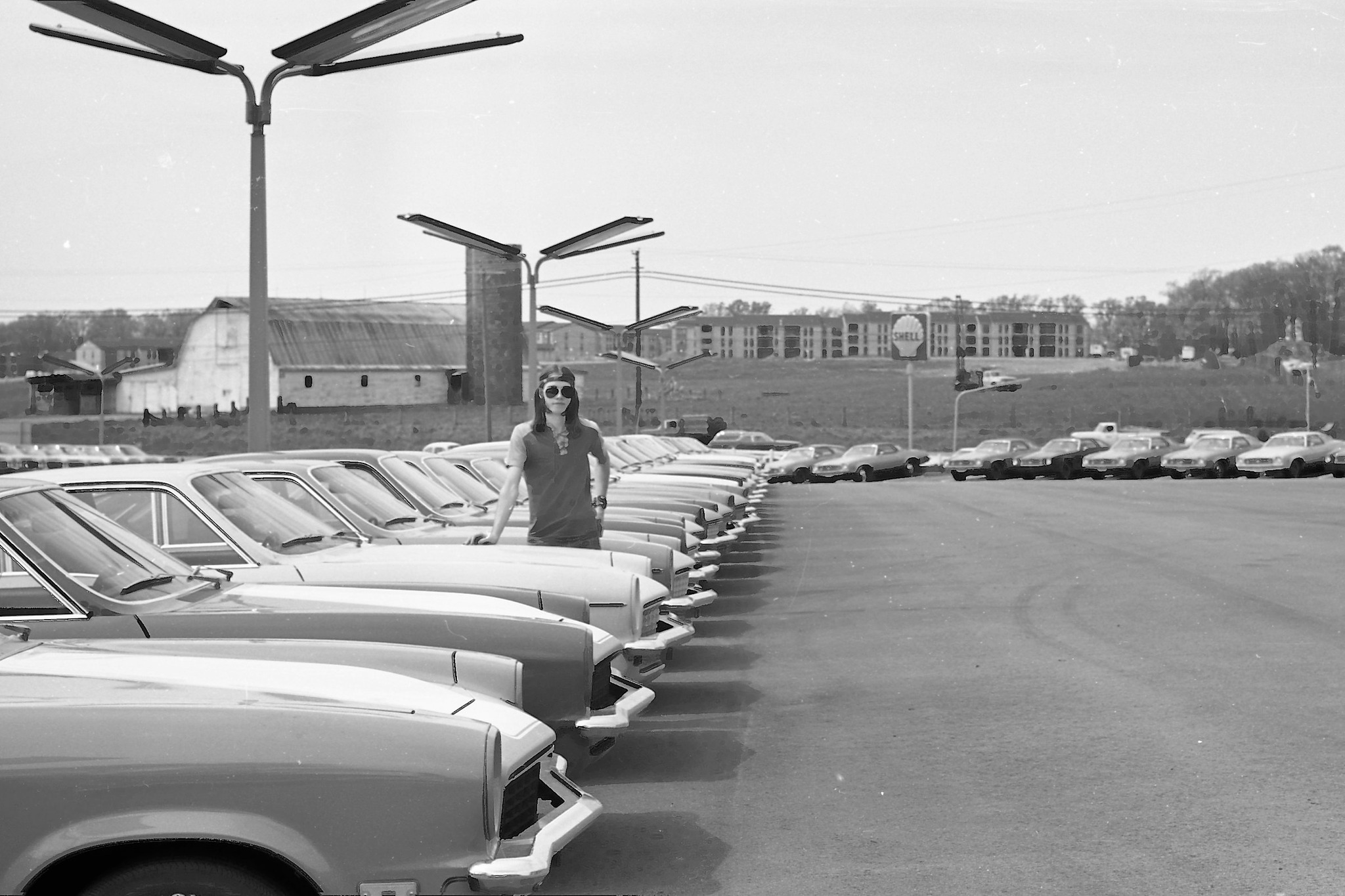
Gaithersburg Chevrolet dealership in 1973

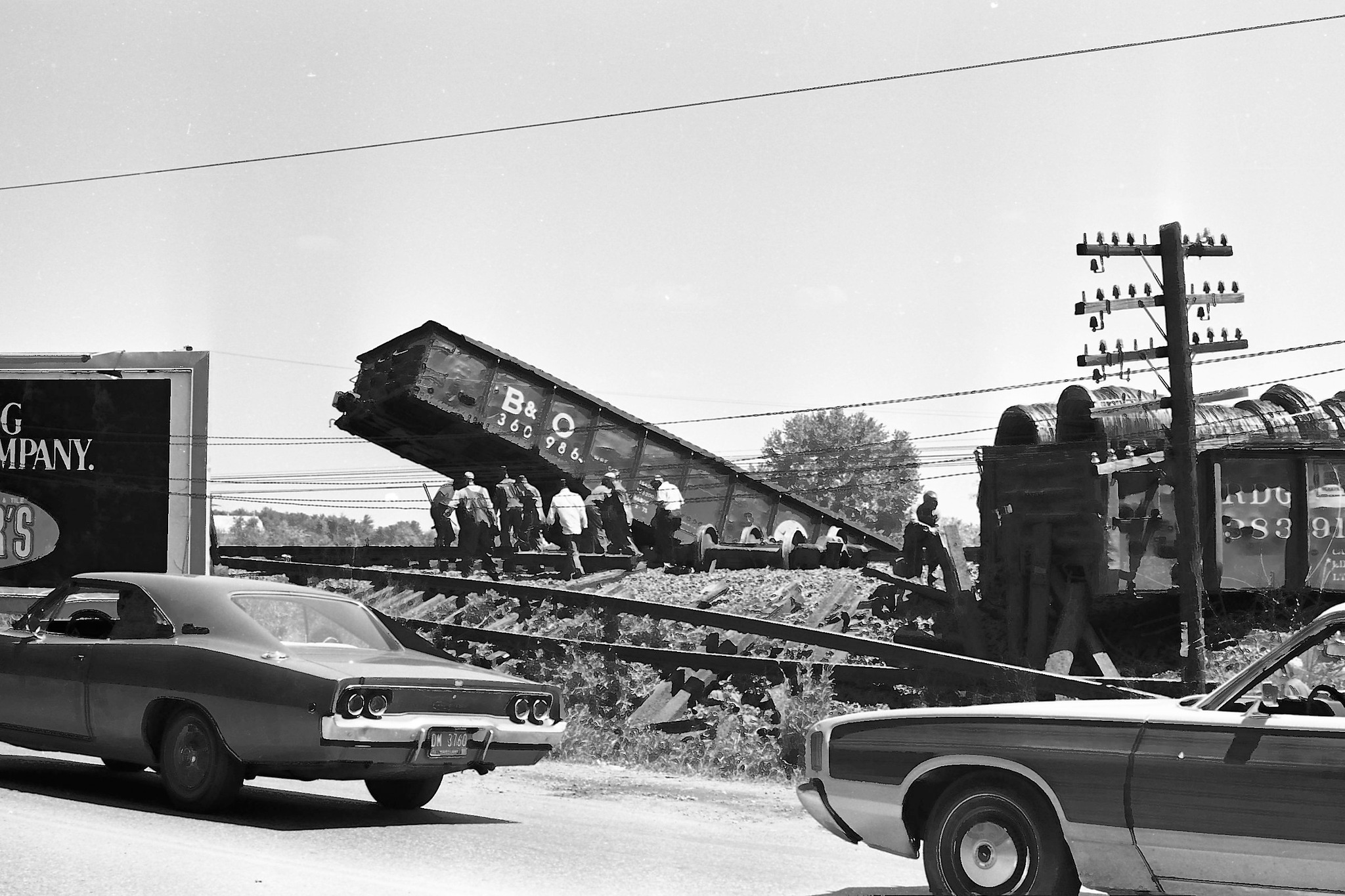
Train derailment in Gaithersburg in 1973

Gaithersburg was settled in 1765 as a small agricultural settlement known as Log Town near the present-day Summit Hall on Ralph Crabb's 1725 land grant "Deer Park". The northern portion of the land grant was purchased by Henry Brookes, and he built his brick home "Montpelier" there, starting with a log cabin, built between 1780 and 1783. In 1802, Benjamin Gaither built his home on the land. In 1807, Gaither married Brooke's daughter Margaret, and Benjamin and Margaret inherited a portion of Henry Brooke's land prior to his death. By the 1850s the area had ceased to be called Log Town and was known to inhabitants as Gaithersburg.

=== 19th century ===
The Forest Oak Post Office, named for a large tree in the town, was located in Gaither's store in 1851.

On July 10, 1864, using the route of present-day Maryland Route 355, over 10,000 Confederate troops camped overnight in the area, including the present Bohrer Park, after a one-day march from Frederick after the Battle of Monocacy. The next day the troops continued towards Washington, D.C. in an unsuccessful attempt to take the national capital.

When the railroad was built through town in 1873, the new station was called Gaithersburg, an officially-recognized name for the community for the first time. Also in 1873, the Baltimore and Ohio Railroad constructed a station at Gaithersburg, designed by Ephraim Francis Baldwin as part of his well-known series of Victorian stations in Maryland. Rapid growth occurred shortly thereafter, and on April 5, 1878, the town was officially incorporated as the Town of Gaithersburg.

Gaithersburg boomed during the late 19th century and churches, schools, a mill, grain elevators, stores, and hotels were built. Much of this development focused around the railroad station.

In 1899, Gaithersburg was selected as one of six global locations for the construction of an International Latitude Observatory as part of a project to measure the Earth's wobble on its polar axis; as of 2007, the Gaithersburg Latitude Observatory is the only National Historic Landmark in Gaithersburg. The observatory and five other observatories in Japan, Italy, Russia, and the U.S. gathered information, which, along with information from satellites, is used to determine polar motion, the size, shape, and physical properties of the Earth, and to aid the space program through the precise navigational patterns of orbiting satellites. The Gaithersburg station operated until 1982 when computerization rendered the manual observation obsolete.

=== 20th century ===
In 1968, Gaithersburg was upgraded from a town to a city. In the late 1960s and 1970s, a 1,000-acre tract on I-270 became part of IBM's headquarters.

Gaithersburg remained a predominantly rural farm town until the 1970s when more construction began. As the population grew, with homes spreading throughout the area, Gaithersburg began taking on a suburban and semi-urban feel, leaving its farming roots behind. During the late 1990s and 2000s, it had become one of the most economically and ethnically diverse areas in the Washington, D.C. Metropolitan Area as well as the State of Maryland, with people from all walks of life calling Gaithersburg home. This can be seen in the local schools, with Gaithersburg High School and Watkins Mill High School having two of the most diverse student bodies in the region.

During a 1997 rainstorm, the 295-year-old forest oak tree that gave its name to the Forest Oak Post Office crashed down. The tree served as the inspiration for the city's logo, which is also featured prominently on the city's flag.

=== 21st century ===
In 2007, parts of the film Body of Lies were filmed in the city, at a building on 100 Edison Park Drive. The film was released in 2008 and the building is now the Montgomery County Police Department's headquarters.

On July 16, 2010, Gaithersburg was part of the area where a 3.6 magnitude earthquake was felt, one of the strongest to occur in Maryland.

After years of decline and loss of tenants, including three of its four anchor stores in 2019, Lakeforest Mall closed on March 31, 2023, with plans to demolish it and redevelop the area.

Gaithersburg is also the location of the United States Army Reserve Legal Command. The NIST Historic District was listed on the National Register of Historic Places in 2021.

== Geography ==
According to the U.S. Census Bureau, the city has a total area of 10.34 square miles (26.78 km^{2}), of which 10.20 square miles (26.42 km^{2}) is land and 0.14 square miles (0.36 km^{2}) is water.

== Demographics ==
Historical population
Census	Pop.	Note	%±
1900	547		—
1910	625		14.3%
1920	729		16.6%
1930	1,068		46.5%
1940	1,021		−4.4%
1950	1,755		71.9%
1960	3,847		119.2%
1970	8,344		116.9%
1980	26,424		216.7%
1990	39,542		49.6%
2000	52,613		33.1%
2010	59,933		13.9%
2020	69,657		16.2%
2024 (est.)	70,686		1.5%
U.S. Decennial Census; 2010–2020; 2024 estimate

=== 2020 census ===
As of the 2020 census, Gaithersburg had a population of 69,657. The median age was 36.7 years. 23.4% of residents were under the age of 18 and 13.1% of residents were 65 years of age or older. For every 100 females there were 92.7 males, and for every 100 females age 18 and over there were 89.3 males age 18 and over.

100.0% of residents lived in urban areas, while 0.0% lived in rural areas.

There were 25,908 households in Gaithersburg, of which 35.0% had children under the age of 18 living in them. Of all households, 46.0% were married-couple households, 17.6% were households with a male householder and no spouse or partner present, and 30.6% were households with a female householder and no spouse or partner present. About 27.8% of all households were made up of individuals and 9.9% had someone living alone who was 65 years of age or older.

There were 27,182 housing units, of which 4.7% were vacant. The homeowner vacancy rate was 1.1% and the rental vacancy rate was 5.3%.

Racial composition as of the 2020 census
Race	Number	Percent
White	24,271	34.8%
Black or African American	11,533	16.6%
American Indian and Alaska Native	644	0.9%
Asian	13,305	19.1%
Native Hawaiian and Other Pacific Islander	83	0.1%
Some other race	11,906	17.1%
Two or more races	7,915	11.4%
Hispanic or Latino (of any race)	19,834	28.5%

=== 2022 ACS ===
As of the 2022 American Community Survey, there were 68,952 people and 24,523 households in the town. The racial makeup of the city was 33% White, 13% Black, 15% Asian, and 1% from other races. Hispanic people of any race were 36% of the population.

The median household income was $95,453, and 6% of people were under the poverty line.

The average time to work was 30 minutes, 57% of people drove alone, 11% carpooled, 8% took public transit, 1% biked, 2% walked and 20% worked from home.

=== 2010 census ===
As of the census of 2010, there were 59,933 people, 22,000 households, and 14,548 families residing in the city. The population density was 5,875.8 inhabitants per square mile (2,268.7/km^{2}). There were 23,337 housing units at an average density of 2,287.9 per square mile (883.4/km^{2}). The racial makeup of the city was 31.9% White, 16.3% African American, 0.5% Native American, 16.9% Asian (6.01 Chinese, 4.77% Indian, 2.03% Korean, 1.69% Filipino, 1.02% Vietnamese, 0.62% Burmese), 0.1% Pacific Islander, 10.7% from other races, and 4.8% from two or more races. Hispanic or Latino people were 24.2% of the population (8.3% Salvadoran, 2% Honduran, 1.9% Mexican, 1.9% Peruvian, 1.7% Guatemalan).

There were 22,000 households, of which 37.1% had children under the age of 18 living with them, 48.3% were married couples living together, 12.7% had a female householder with no husband present, 5.1% had a male householder with no wife present, and 33.9% were non-families. 26.7% of all households were made up of individuals, and 7.5% had someone living alone who was 65 years of age or older. The average household size was 2.70 and the average family size was 3.24.

The median age in the city was 35.1 years. 24.2% of residents were under the age of 18; 7.9% were between the ages of 18 and 24; 33.8% were from 25 to 44; 24.6% were from 45 to 64; and 9.5% were 65 years of age or older. The gender makeup of the city was 48.6% male and 51.4% female.

=== 2000 census ===
As of the census of 2000, there were 52,613 people, 19,621 households, and 12,577 families residing in the city. The population density was 5,216.2 inhabitants per square mile (2,014.0/km^{2}). There were 20,674 housing units at an average density of 2,049.7 per square mile (791.4/km^{2}). The racial makeup of the city was 34.7% White, 19.5% Black or African American, 0.2% Native American, 13.9% Asian, 0.1% Pacific Islander, 3.6% from other races, and 3.2% from two or more races. 24.8% of the population were Hispanic or Latino of any race. 34.3% of Gaithersburg's population was foreign-born.

There were 19,621 households, out of which 34.8% had children under the age of 18 living with them, 48.6% were married couples living together, 11.2% had a female householder with no husband present, and 35.9% were non-families. 27.8% of all households were made up of individuals, and 7.2% had someone living alone who was 65 years of age or older. The average household size was 2.65 and the average family size was 3.14 the population was spread out, with 25.0% under the age of 18, 9.0% from 18 to 24, 37.7% from 25 to 44, 20.0% from 45 to 64, and 8.2% who were 65 years of age or older. The median age was 34 years. For every 100 females, there were 95.1 males. For every 100 females age 18 and over, there were 92.4 males.

== Economy ==
According to the city's 2020 Comprehensive Annual Financial Report, the top employers in the city are:

#	Employer	# of employees
1	AstraZeneca (formerly MedImmune)	4,000
2	National Institute of Standards and Technology	2,798
3	Leidos (merged with Lockheed Martin)	1,515
4	Asbury Methodist Village	771
5	Hughes Network Systems, LLC	729
6	Sodexo USA	536
7	Adventist HealthCare	495
8	GeneDx	350
9	Kaiser Permanente	350
10	Emergent BioSolutions	347

== Government ==
Presidential election results

Presidential election results in Gaithersburg
Year	Democratic	Republican	Others
2020	77.5% 21,286	20.0% 5,487	2.5% 694
2016	75.2% 18,987	19.1% 4,820	5.7% 1,430

Gaithersburg has an elected, five-member city council, which serves as the legislative body of the city. The mayor, who is also elected, serves as non-voting president of the council. The day-to-day administration of the city is overseen by a career city manager.

The city's current mayor is Jud Ashman, who has held the office since 2014. On October 6, 2014, the Gaithersburg City Council selected city council member Jud Ashman to serve as mayor until the next City of Gaithersburg election in November 2015, replacing resigning Mayor Sidney Katz. Ashman was re-elected in November 2015, and was re-elected to full terms in 2017 and 2021.

== Education ==
The following Montgomery County Public Schools are located in Gaithersburg:

=== Elementary schools ===
- Brown Station
- Darnestown
- Diamond
- DuFief
- Fields Road
- Flower Hill
- Gaithersburg
- Goshen
- Harriet R. Tubman
- Jones Lane
- Judith A. Resnik
- Laytonsville
- Rachel Carson
- Rosemont
- South Lake
- Stedwick
- Strawberry Knoll
- Summit Hall
- Thurgood Marshall
- Washington Grove
- Watkins Mill
- Whetstone
- Woodfield

=== Middle schools ===
- Forest Oak
- Gaithersburg
- Lakelands Park Middle School
- Ridgeview
- Shady Grove

=== High schools ===
- Gaithersburg High School
- Quince Orchard High School
- Watkins Mill High School

== Media ==
Gaithersburg is primarily served by the Washington, D.C. media market.

=== Newspapers ===
- The Town Courier newspaper was based in Kentlands and focused on Gaithersburg's west side neighborhoods, in addition to publishing Rockville and Urbana editions. It ceased operations in March 2020.

=== Filming location ===
- Part of the 2006 film Borat was filmed in Gaithersburg in 2005.
- Part of an episode of Da Ali G Show was filmed in Gaithersburg in 2004.
- Some of The Blair Witch Project was filmed in Seneca Creek State Park

== Infrastructure ==
=== Police ===
Gaithersburg also has its own police department, which was created in 1963.

=== Transportation ===
==== Roads and highways ====
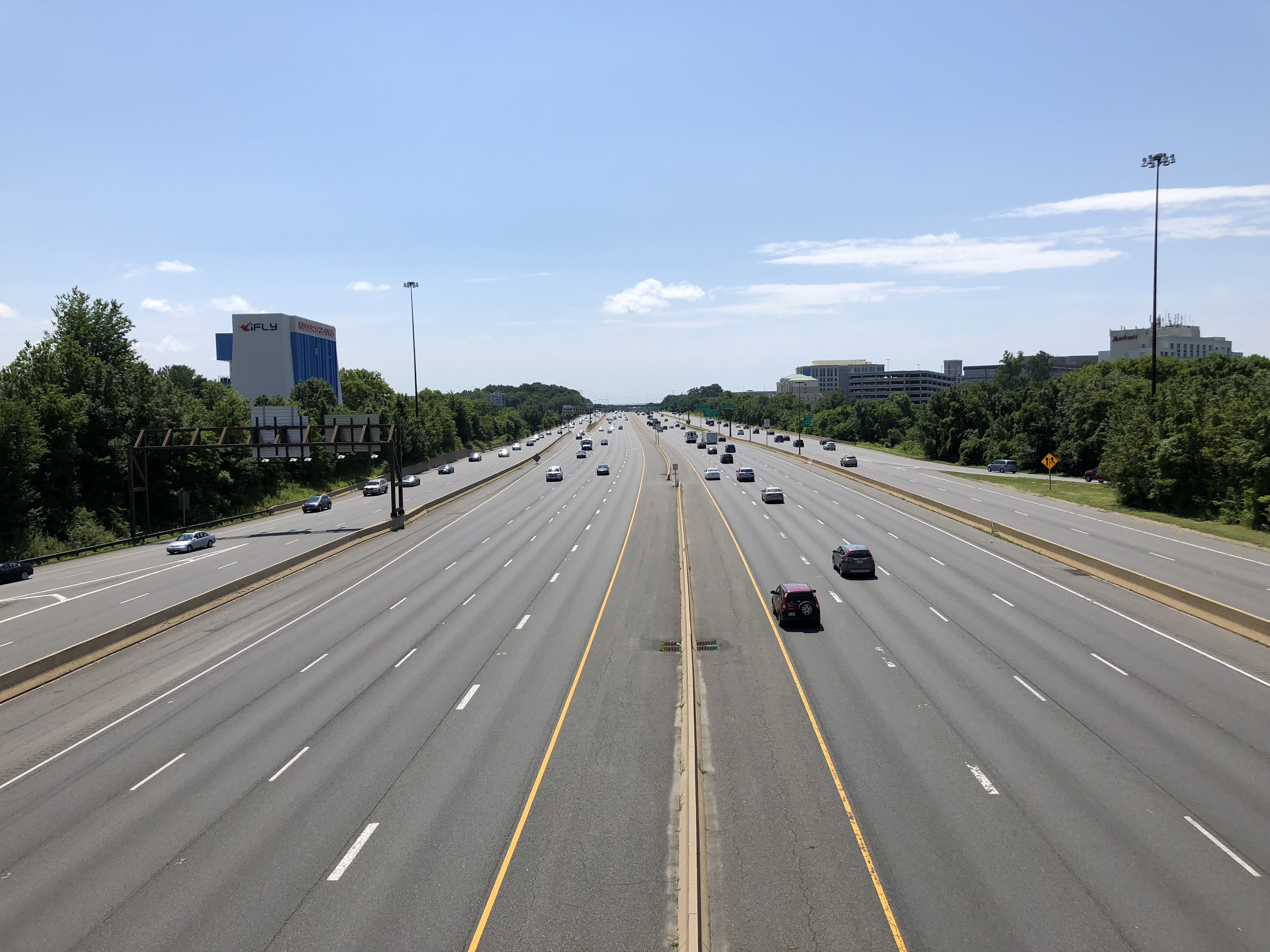
I-270 southbound at the interchange with I-370 in Gaithersburg

The most prominent highways serving Gaithersburg are Interstate 270 and Interstate 370. I-270 is the main highway leading northwest out of metropolitan Washington, D.C., beginning at Interstate 495 (the Capital Beltway) and proceeding northwestward to Interstate 70 in Frederick. I-370 is a short spur, starting just west of I-270 in Gaithersburg and heading east to its junction with Maryland Route 200. Via MD 200, I-370 connects Gaithersburg with Interstate 95 near Laurel.

Maryland Route 355 was the precursor to I-270 and follows a parallel route. It now serves as the main commercial roadway through Gaithersburg and neighboring communities. Other state highways serving Gaithersburg include Maryland Route 117, Maryland Route 119 and Maryland Route 124. Maryland Route 28 passes just outside the Gaithersburg corporate limits.

==== Transit ====
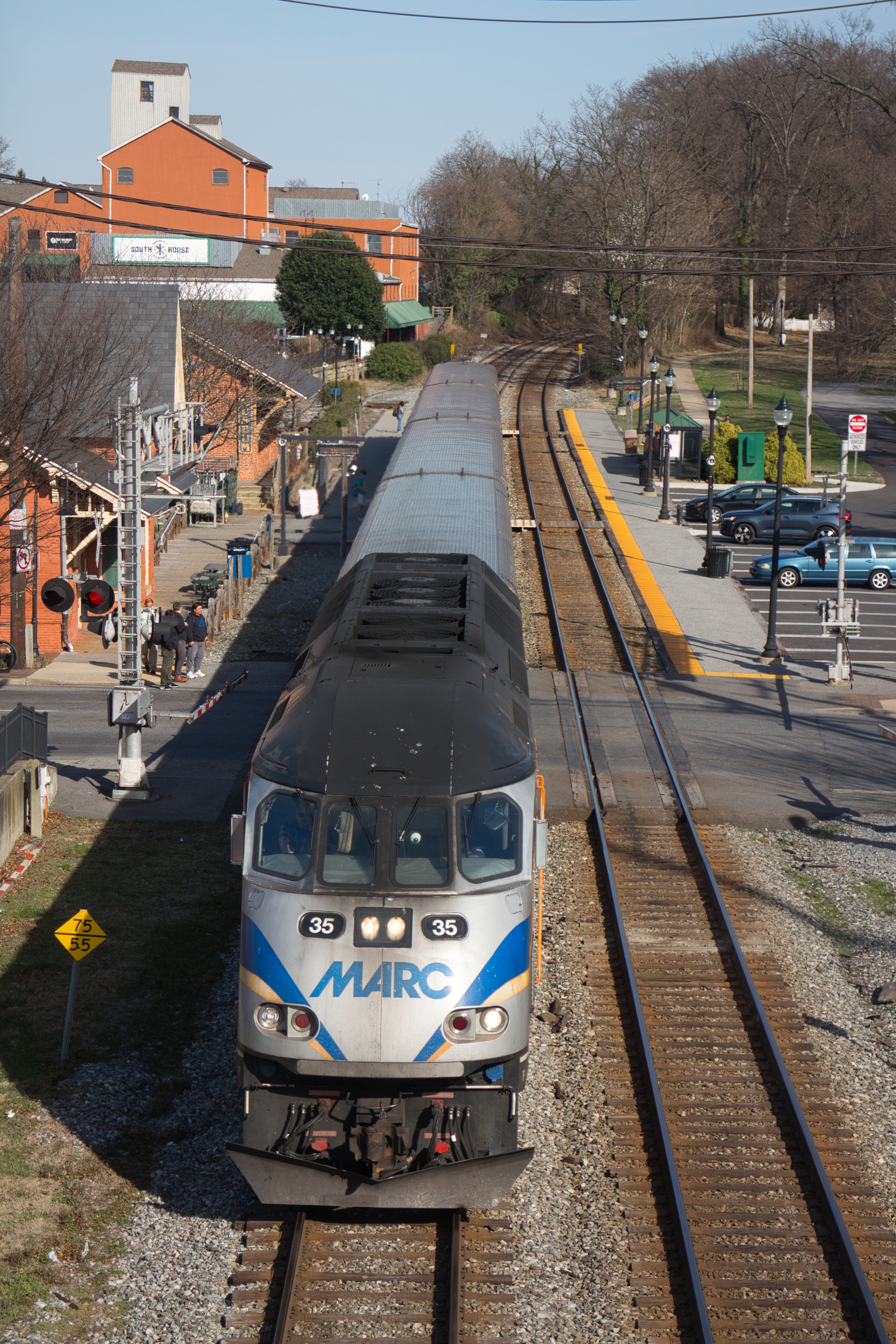
A MARC train, stopped at Gaithersburg station in Montgomery County

Gaithersburg is connected to the Washington Metro via Shady Grove station, which is located just outside the city limits and is the north-western terminus of the Red Line.

Maryland's MARC system operates commuter rail services connecting Gaithersburg to Washington, D.C., with two stations in the city, at Old Town Gaithersburg and Metropolitan Grove, and a third station — Washington Grove — just outside city limits.

Bus service in Gaithersburg consists of Metrobus routes operated by WMATA and Ride-On routes operated by Montgomery County, as well as paratransit service provided by MetroAccess.

Two bus rapid transit lines are proposed in Gaithersburg, but as yet unbuilt: A Flash BRT line along Frederick Avenue (Maryland Route 355) in the eastern half of the city, and the Corridor Cities Transitway in the western half of the city.

=== Airport ===
Montgomery County Airpark is located 3 miles (5 km) northeast of the city.
