= St. Rose of Lima Catholic Church (Gaithersburg, Maryland) =

Saint Rose of Lima Catholic Church
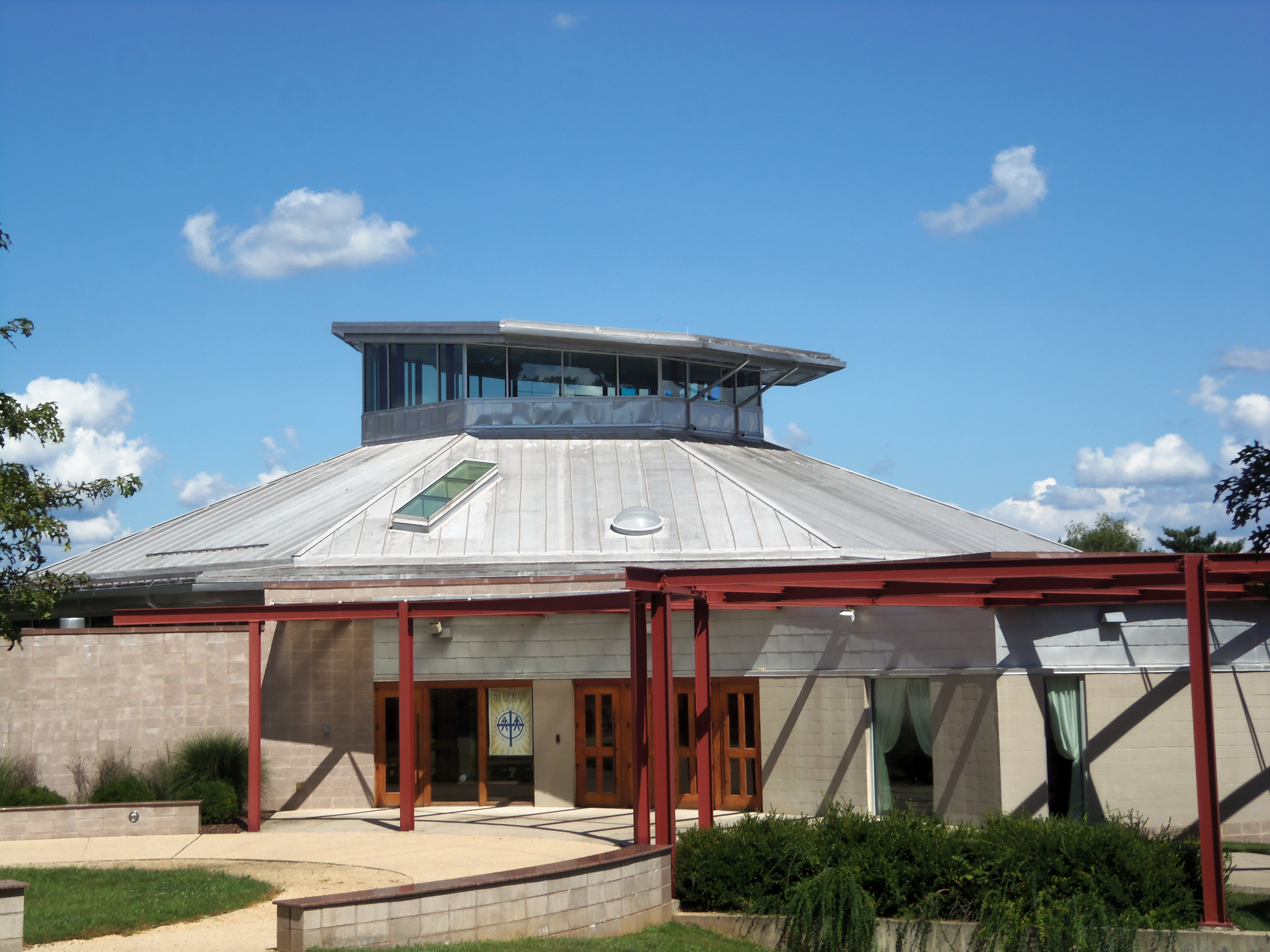
- Saint Rose of Lima Catholic Church
- Saint Rose of Lima Catholic Church
- 39.150227°N 77.241612°W
- Location: 11701 Clopper Rd, Gaithersburg, Maryland
- Country: United States
- Denomination: Roman Catholic

Administration
- Archdiocese: Washington

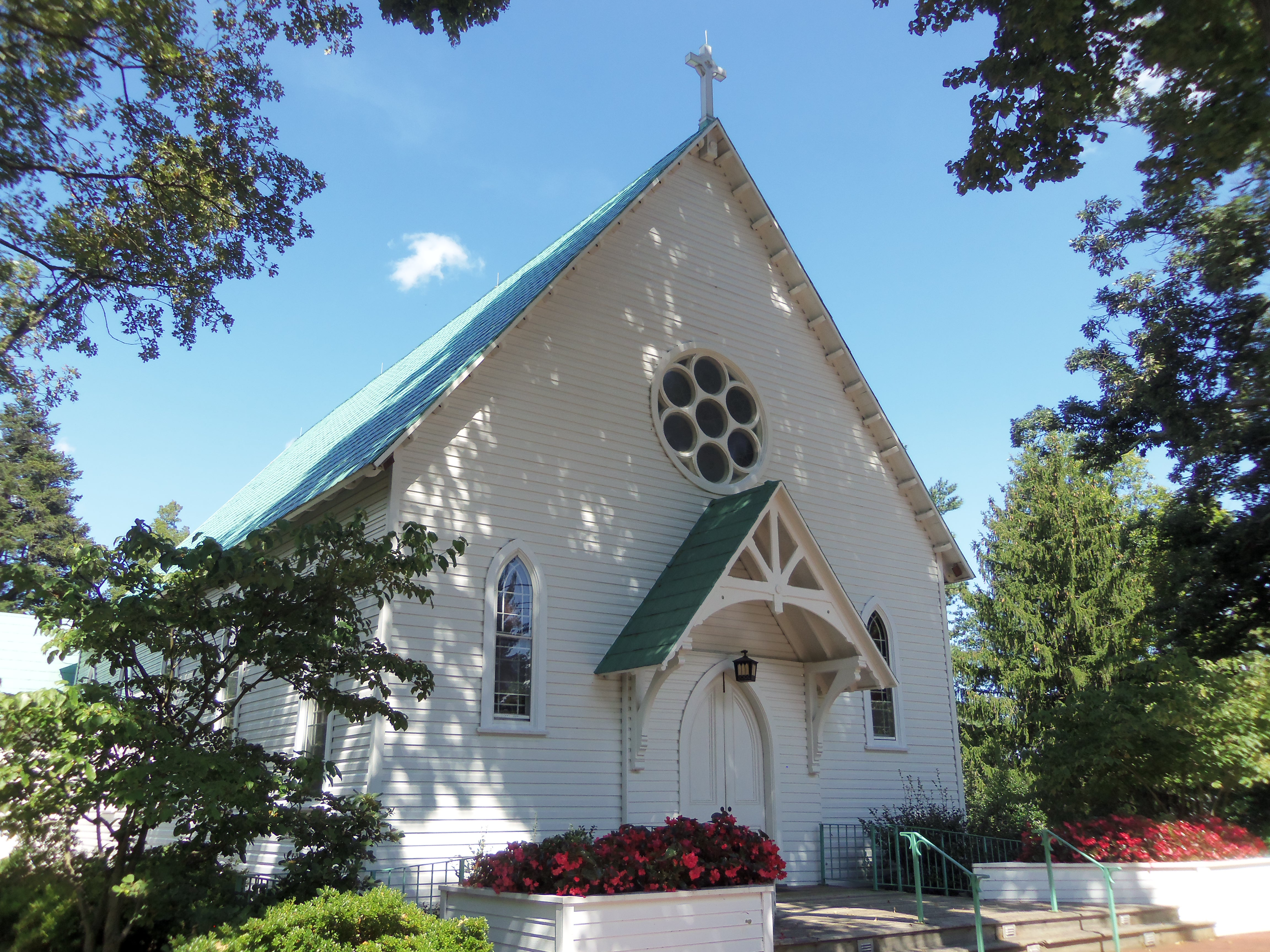
Former church building.

Saint Rose of Lima Catholic Church in Gaithersburg is a parish of the Roman Catholic Church in Maryland in the United States. It falls under the jurisdiction of the Archdiocese of Washington and its archbishop. It is named after Saint Rose of Lima of Peru.
