= Benjamin Gaither =

Founder of Gaithersburg (c. 1784–1838)

- Born: c. 1784
- Died: 1838 (aged 53–54)

Benjamin Gaither (c. 1784 – 1838) is the namesake of Gaithersburg, a U.S. city located in Montgomery County, Maryland.

Benjamin Gaither was the son of Henry and Martha Ridgely Gaither and was born approximately 1784. Through his mother, he descended from Hon. John Dorsey. He married Margaret Brookes who was the daughter of Henry C. Brooks and Martha (Bowie) Brooks. A slave owner, Gaither owned 11 slaves in 1824. Gaither's family traces its roots to colonial Jamestown in the 1600s and settled in Montgomery County after the Revolutionary War.

Benjamin Gaither died in 1838.
