= NIST Historic District =

- U.S. National Register of Historic Places
- U.S. Historic district
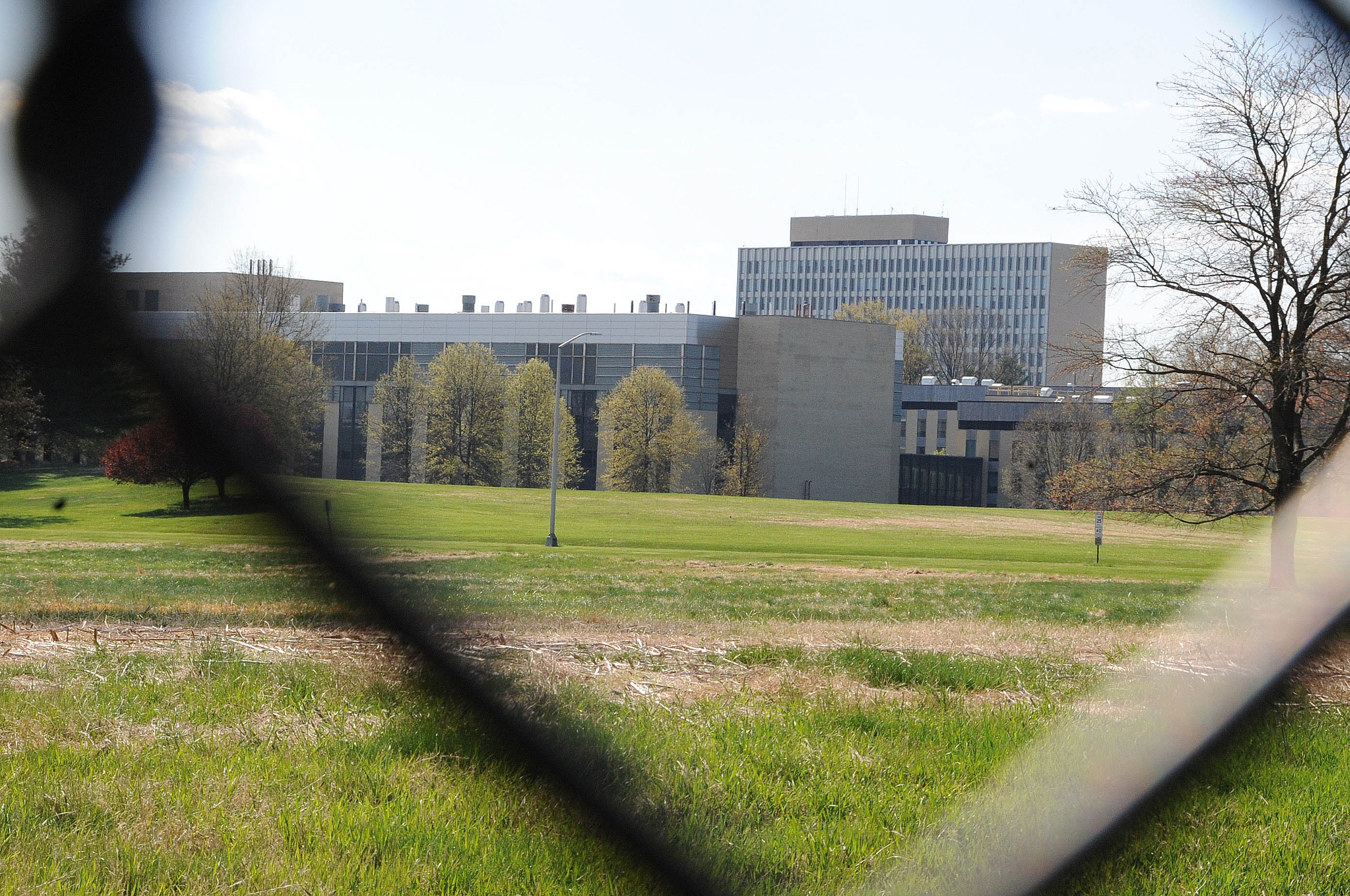
- NIST Historic District, April 2022

- Location within Maryland Location within the United States
- Location: 100 Bureau Dr., Gaithersburg, Maryland
- Coordinates: 39°08′28″N 77°13′05″W
- Built: 1962-1969
- Architects: Voorhees Walker Smith Smith & Haines; HLW International
- Architectural style: International Style
- NRHP reference No.: 100006800
- Added to NRHP: August 5, 2021

NIST Historic District is a national historic district located at Gaithersburg, Montgomery County, Maryland. It was listed on the National Register of Historic Places in 2021. The 579-acre district is a Federal research campus housing the National Institute of Standards and Technology. It includes 74 buildings, structures, objects, and sites on a landscaped campus. The district encompasses several notable features such as the Administrative Building (with a distinctive pinwheel-shaped footprint), the original seven connected General Purpose Laboratories (220, 221, 222, 223, 224, 225, and 226), and the Newton Apple Tree.

== Notable features ==
The NIST Historic District comprises 27 contributing resources, including 24 buildings and 3 other features that add to the historic nature of the district.

Contributing Resources in the NIST Historic District
Building No.	Building Name	Construction Date
101	101 Administration Building	1962-1965
202	202 Engineering Mechanics	1961-1963
206	206 Concrete Materials	1966-1968
220	220 Metrology	1963-1966
221	221 Physics	1963-1966
222	222 Chemistry	1963-1966
223	223 Materials	1963-1966
224	224 Polymer	1963-1966
225	225 Technology	1963-1966
226	226 Building Research	1963-1966
230	230 Fluid Mechanics	1967-1969
231	231 Industrial	1966-1968
233	233 Sound	1965-1968
235	NCNR	1963-1967, 1989-1990, 2009
236	236 Hazards	1966-1968
237	237 Non-Magnetic Offices	1964-1968
238	238 Non-Magnetic Laboratory	1964-1968
245	245 Radiation Physics	1962-1964, 2020
301	301 Supply and Plant	1962-1964, ca. 1990s, ca. 2010
302	Steam and Chilled Water Generation Plant	1961-1964, ca. 1990s, ca. 2010
303	303 Service	1962-1964
304	304 Shops	1962-1964
306A	306A PEPCO Electrical Substation	1961-1964
306B	306B PEPCO Electrical Substation	1961-1964
-	Campus Landscape Plan associated with the GPLs and Building 101, including vehicular and pedestrian circulation networks and parking lots, including the East Drive allee, the Newton Apple Tree	1961-1969; 1966
-	Flagpole	1965
-	Masonry Test Wall	1977 (and earlier)

The NIST Historic District also contains 44 non-contributing resources that were built outside the period of significance (1962-1969) or lack historical character.

Non-Contributing Resources within the NIST Historic District
Building No.	Building Name	Construction Date
103	Visitor's Center and Gate House	2009
-	Gate House (associated with Visitor's Center)	2009
Gate B	Gate House	ca. 2009
Gate C	Gate House	ca. 2009
Gate F	Gate House	ca. 2009
203	Standard Reference Materials Facility	2012
205	Large Fire Facility	1973-1975, 2014
205E	Emissions Control Electrical	ca. 2000
205M	Emissions Control Mechanical	ca. 2000
205E2	Emissions Control Electrical	ca. 2014
205M2	Emissions Control Mechanical	ca. 2014
2	Hopper	ca. 2014
3	Hopper	ca. 2000
207	Robot Test Facility	2012
208	Net-Zero Energy Residential Test Facility	2012
215	Nanofabrication Facility	2002-2004
216	Center for Nanoscience and Technology (Instrument East)	2001-2002
217	AML Instrument West	2002-2004
218	AML Metrology East	2000-2004
219	AML Metrology West	2000-2004
227	Advanced Chemical Sciences Laboratory	1999
305	Cooling Tower	1961-1964, 1993 (rebuilt), 1995 (expanded), ca. 2011 (rebuilt and expanded)
306	Potomac Electric Power Company (PEPCO) Electrical Substations	ca. 1970
307	Hazardous Chemical Waste Storage	1970-1971
309	Grounds Maintenance	1974-1978
310	Hazardous Materials Storage	1986-1987
311	Grounds Storage Shed	1990
312	Materials Processing Facility	1996
313	Site Effluent Neutralization	1996
314	Backflow Preventer Building	1998
315	Backflow Preventer Building	1998
316	Electrical Service Building	1998
317	Cooling Tower	2010
-	Building associated with 317	2010
318	ES Consolidated Facility	2014
319	ES Storage Building	2014
320	CCC (Child Care Center)	2013
321	Liquid Helium Recovery Facility	2016
-	Baseball Field 1	Late 1990s
-	Baseball Field 2	Late 1990s
-	Volleyball Court	ca. 2009
-	Picnic Area	Late 20th century
-	Stormwater Management Pond 3	ca. 2006
-	Entrance Gates	1976
