= J. A. Belt Building =

- Belt, J. A., Building
- U.S. National Register of Historic Places
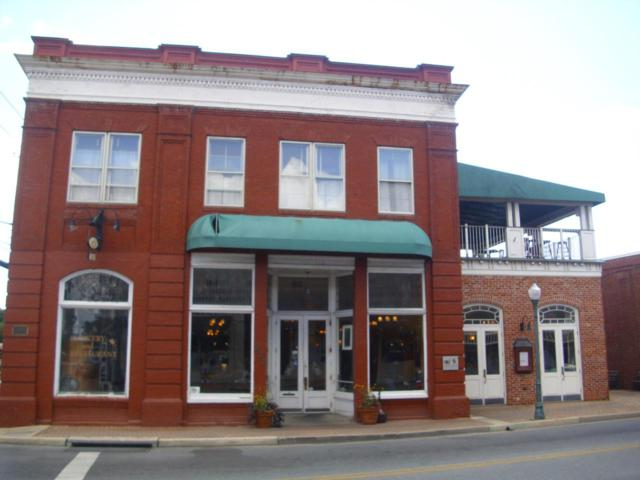

- Location within Maryland Location within the United States
- Location: 227 E. Diamond Ave., Gaithersburg, Maryland
- Coordinates: 39°8′32″N 77°11′39″W
- Area: 0.1 acres (0.040 ha)
- Built: 1903
- NRHP reference No.: 84001845
- Added to NRHP: August 9, 1984

The John A. Belt Building is a historic commercial building located at 227 East Diamond Avenue in Gaithersburg, Montgomery County, Maryland.

== Description and history ==
It was constructed in 1903, and consists of a two-story rectangular brick building. In the center of the east elevation parapet is raised half-lunette inscribed "1903" and underneath, "J.A. Belt." John A. Belt, was a well known and substantial entrepreneur in Montgomery County in the late 19th and early 20th century.

It was listed on the National Register of Historic Places on August 9, 1984.
