= RIO Washingtonian Center =

Retail center in Gaithersburg, Maryland, US

Coordinates: 39.11723°N 77.19990°W

RIO Washingtonian Center, stylized as rio, is a 760,000 sq ft (71,000 m^{2}) hybrid power center and lifestyle center with shopping, restaurants, and entertainment in Gaithersburg, Maryland located immediately south of the interchange between Interstate 270 and 370. The original RIO building opened in 1982, while the adjacent "Washingtonian Center" and "Washingtonian Waterfront" were developed in 1997 and 2004. It underwent a $30 million renovation in 2020. The center is adjacent to four Marriott-branded hotels. Among them, Gaithersburg Marriott Washingtonian Center was built in Phase I of construction, and was opened in 1993.

== Anchors ==
A two-lane imitation "main street" with small shops, restaurants and parking garages is anchored by four big-box stores:

- Barnes & Noble
- Dick's Sporting Goods
- Kohl's
- Target

An adjacent artificial 9-acre lake featuring additional restaurants, a trail, hotels, a carousel, and paddle boats is anchored by AMC "Dine-In" Theaters and Dave & Buster’s.

== Gallery ==
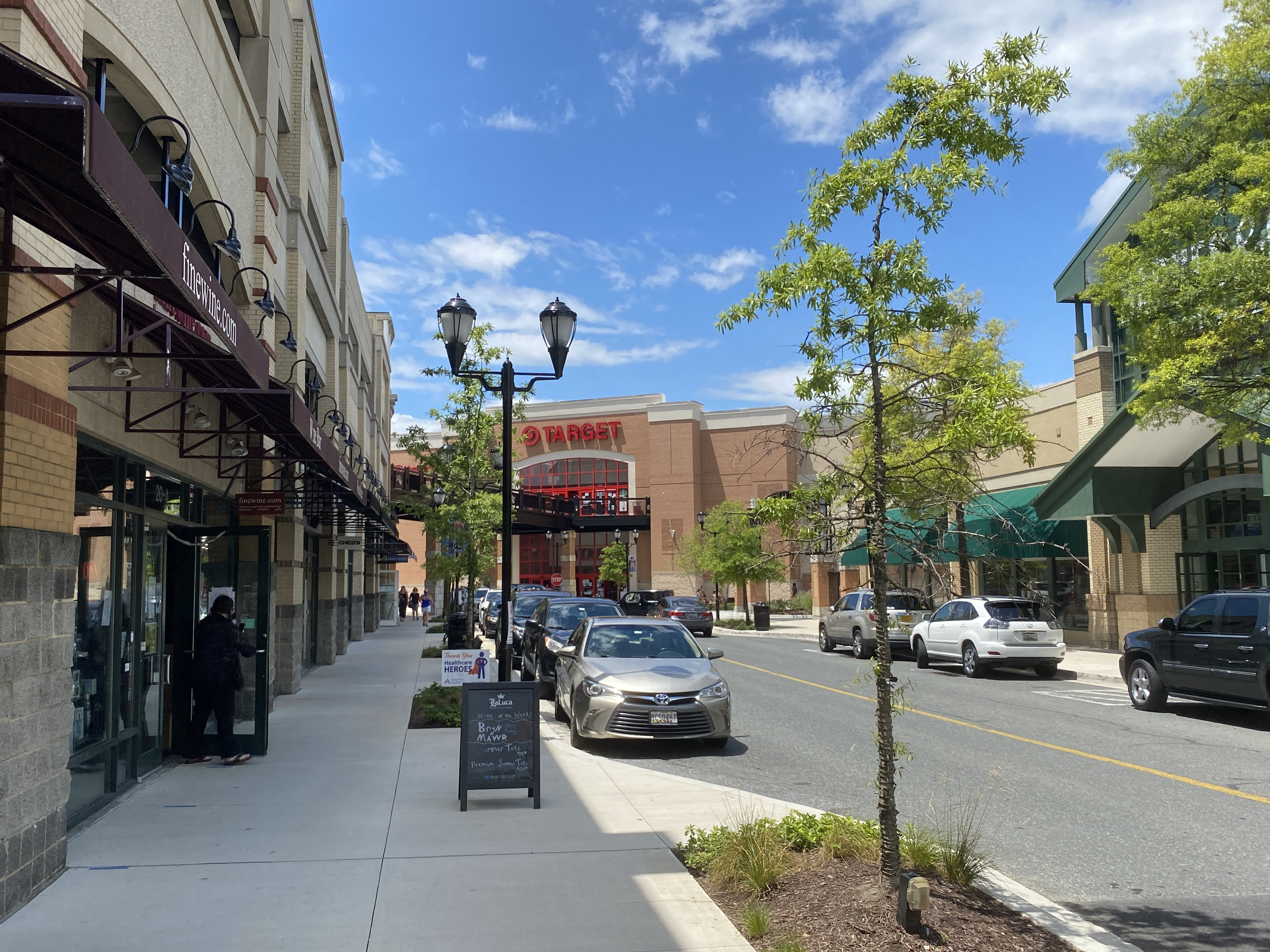

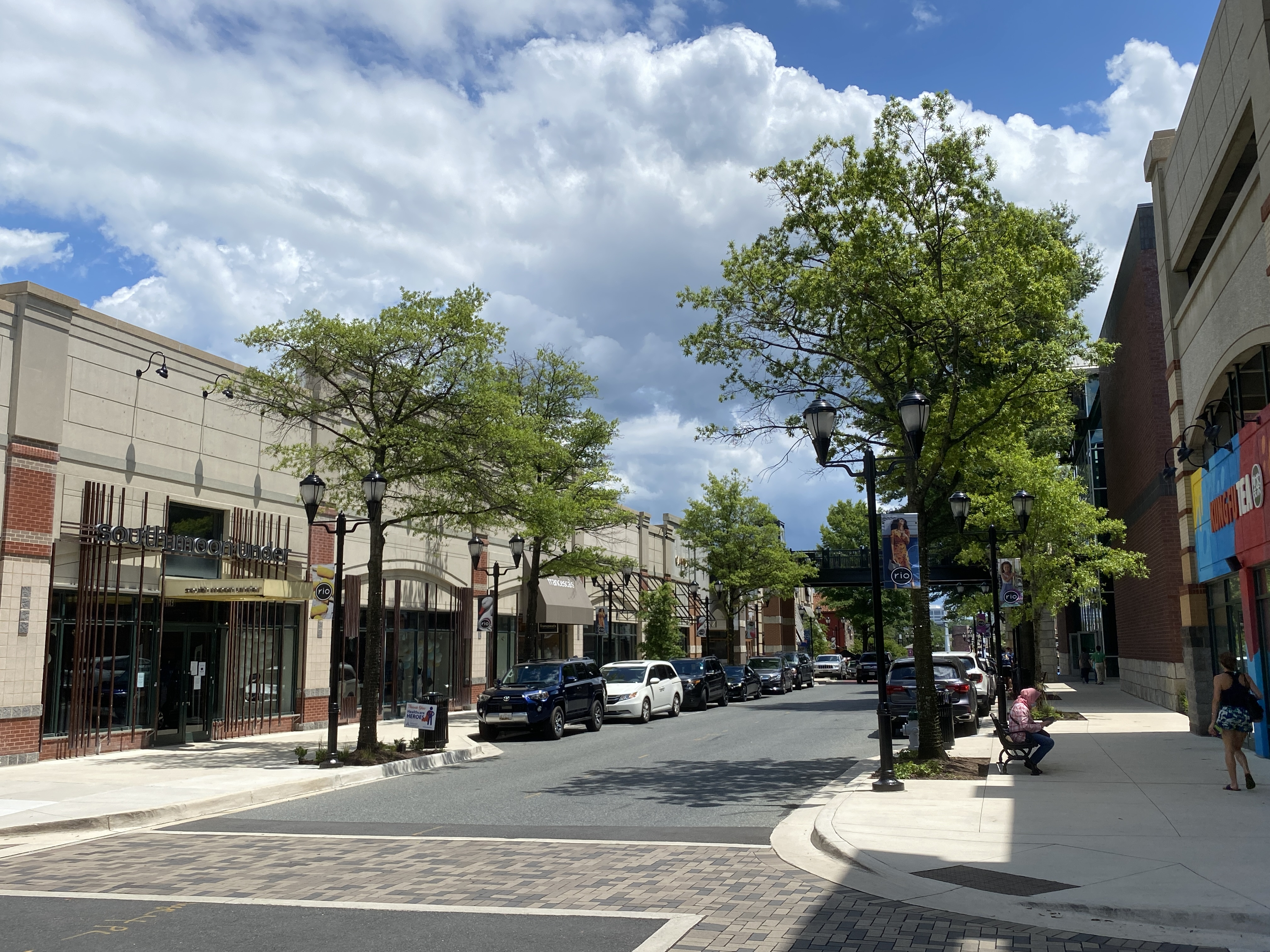

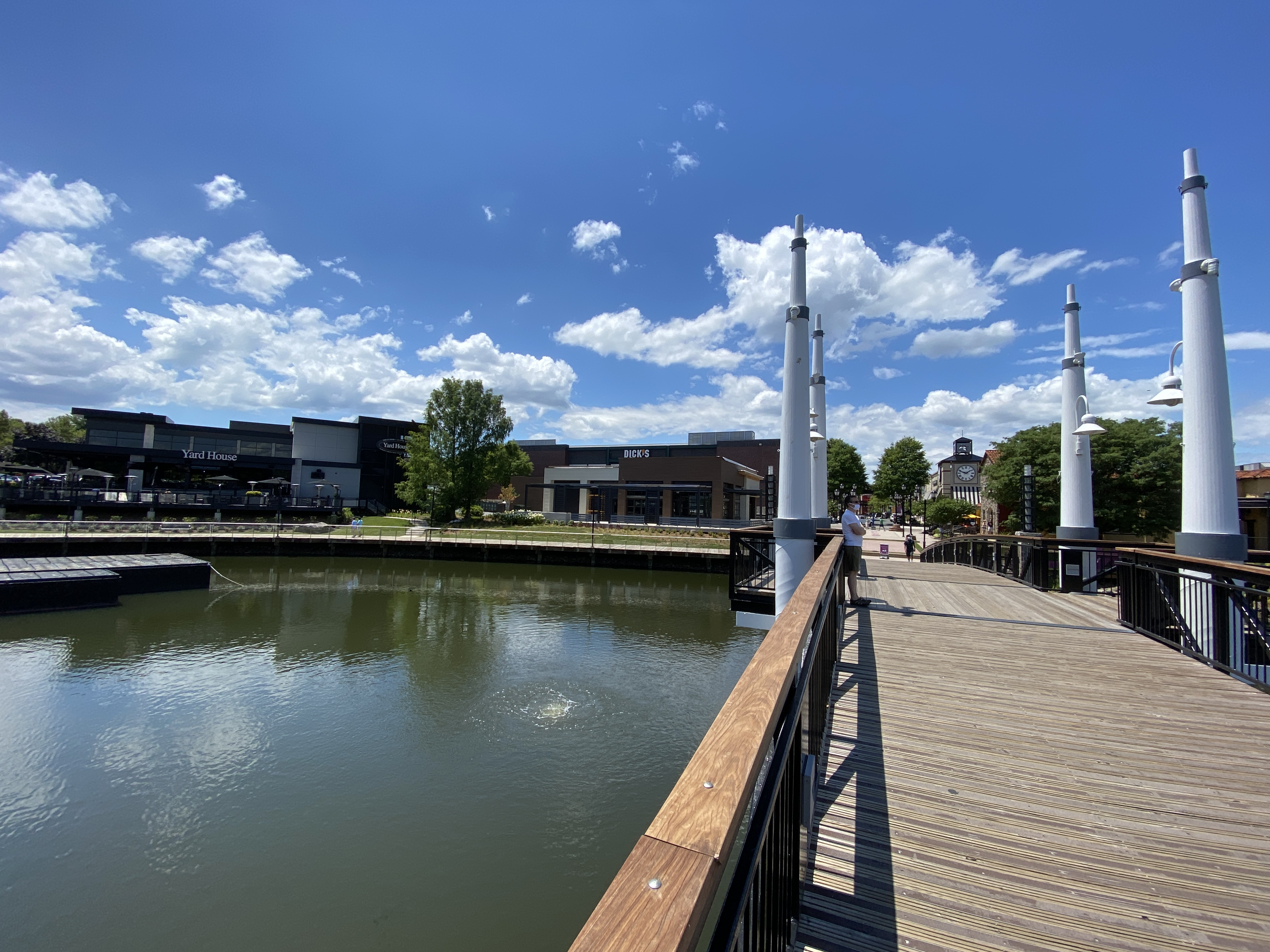

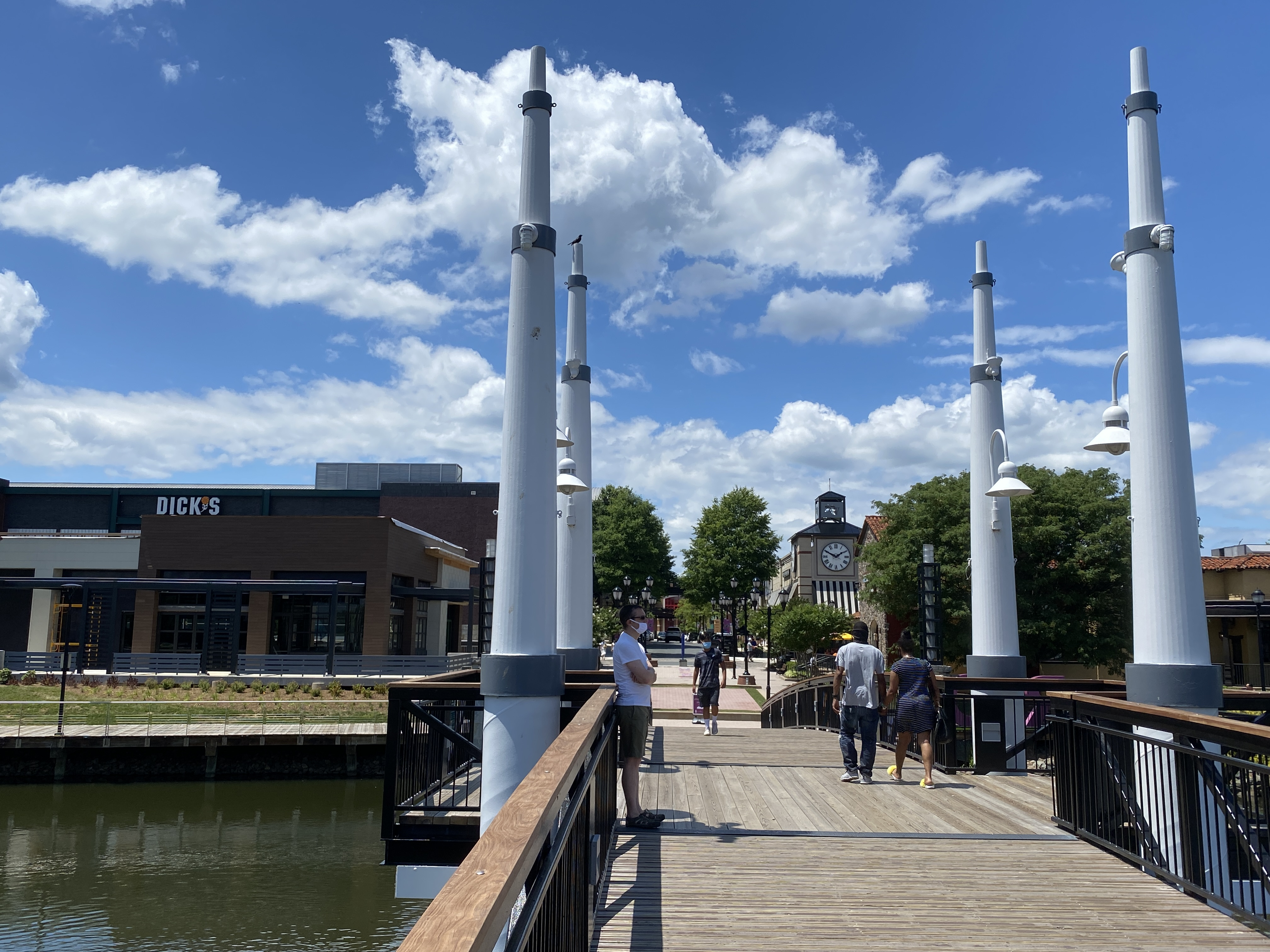

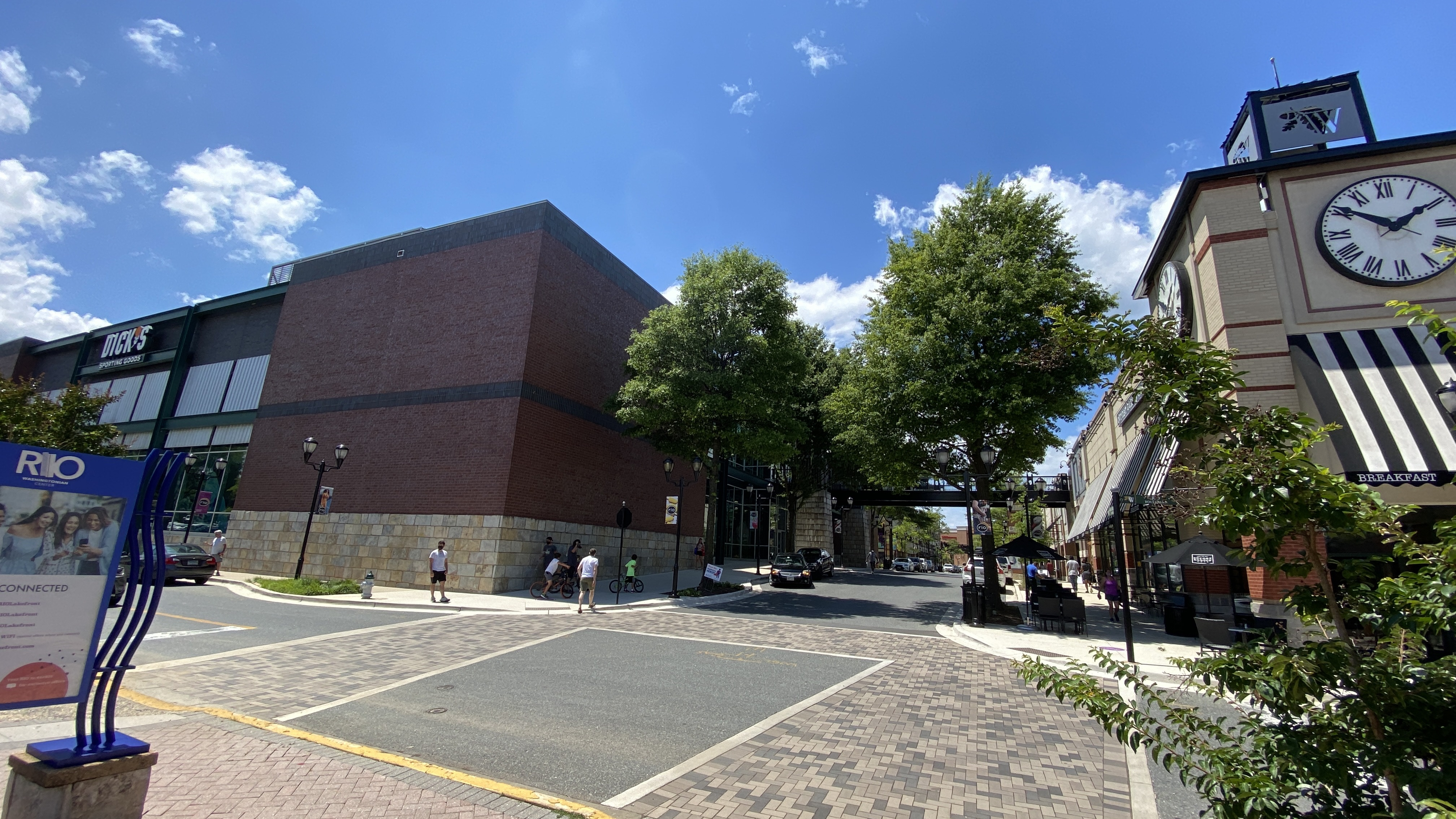

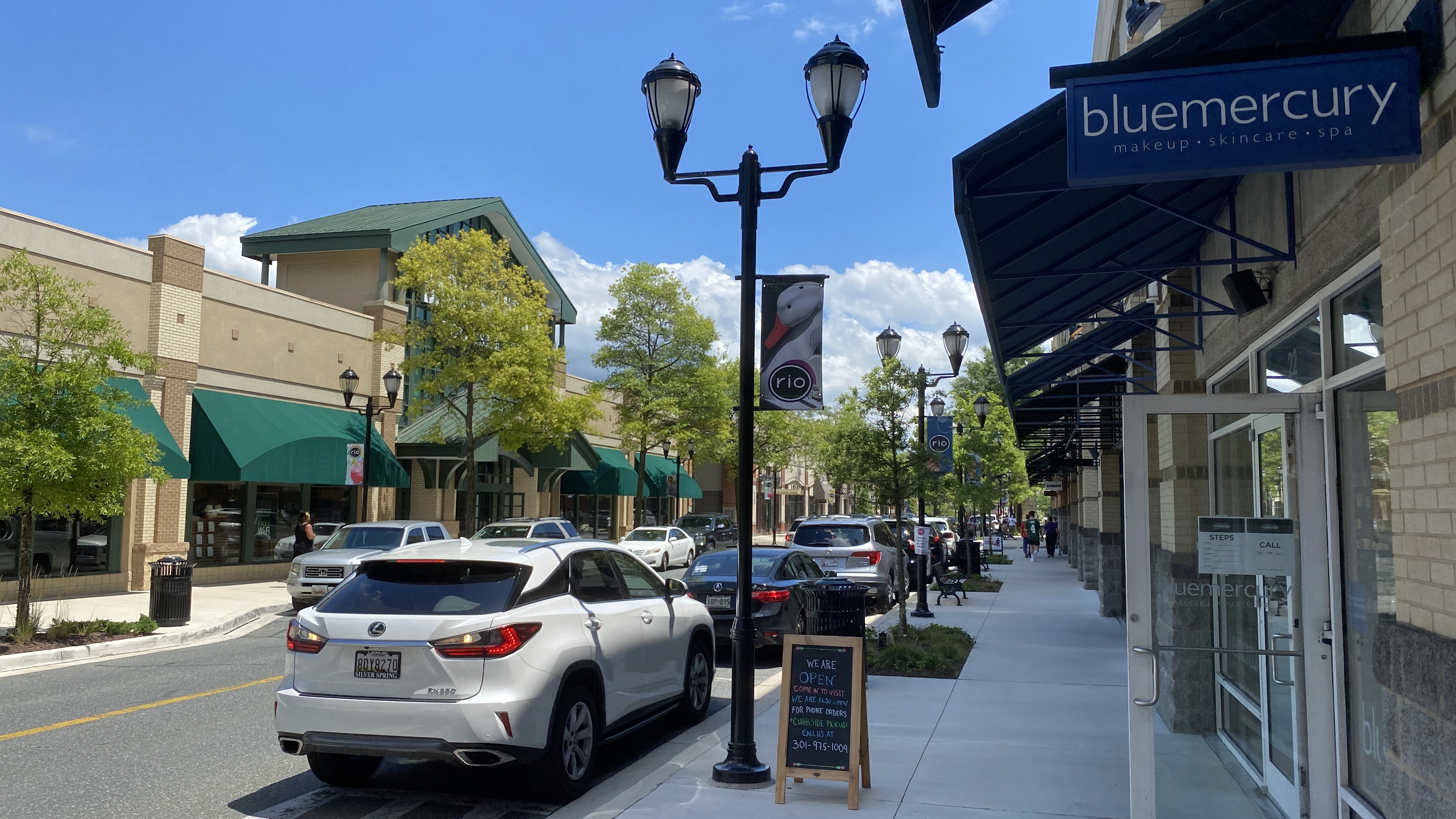

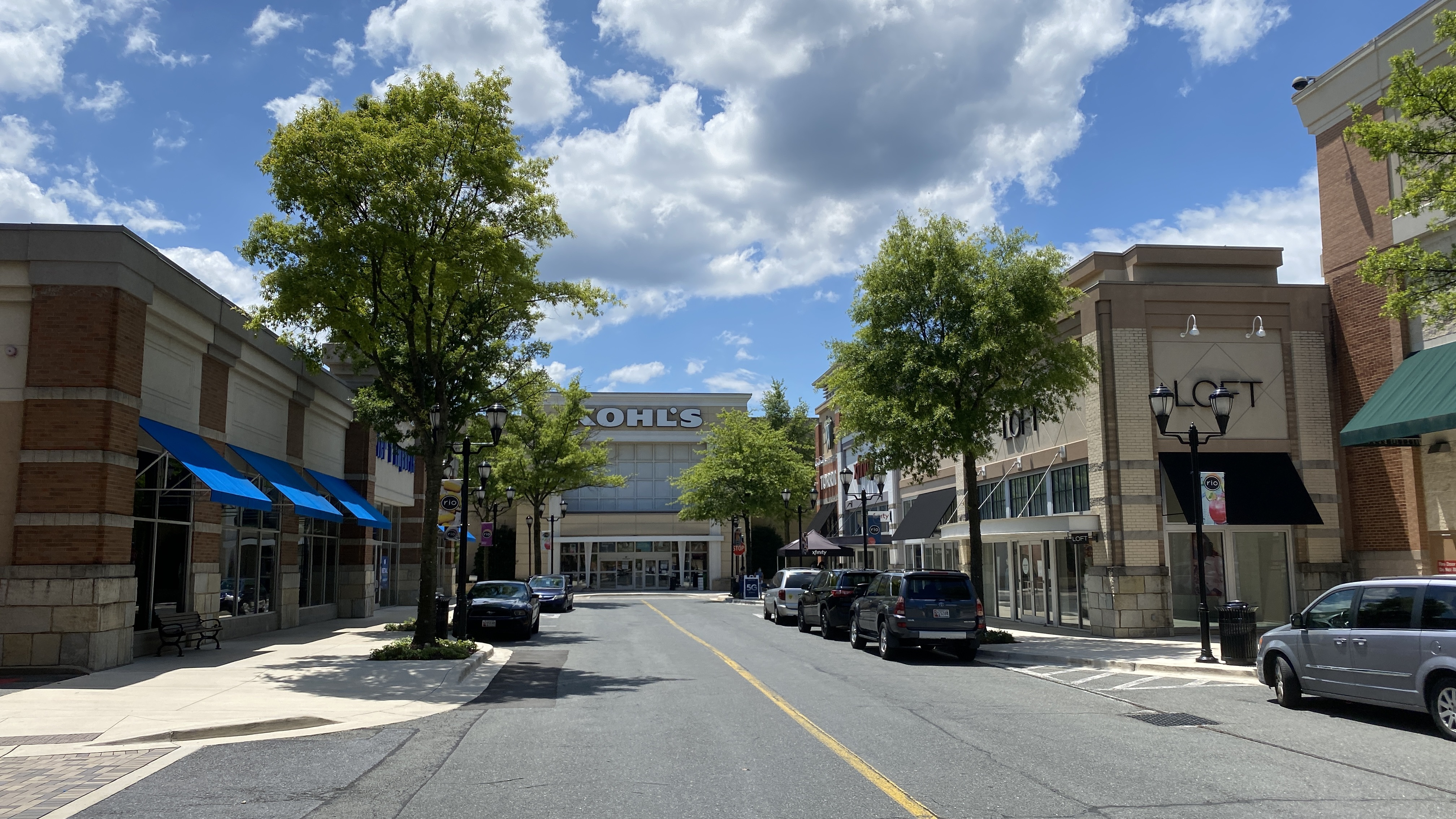

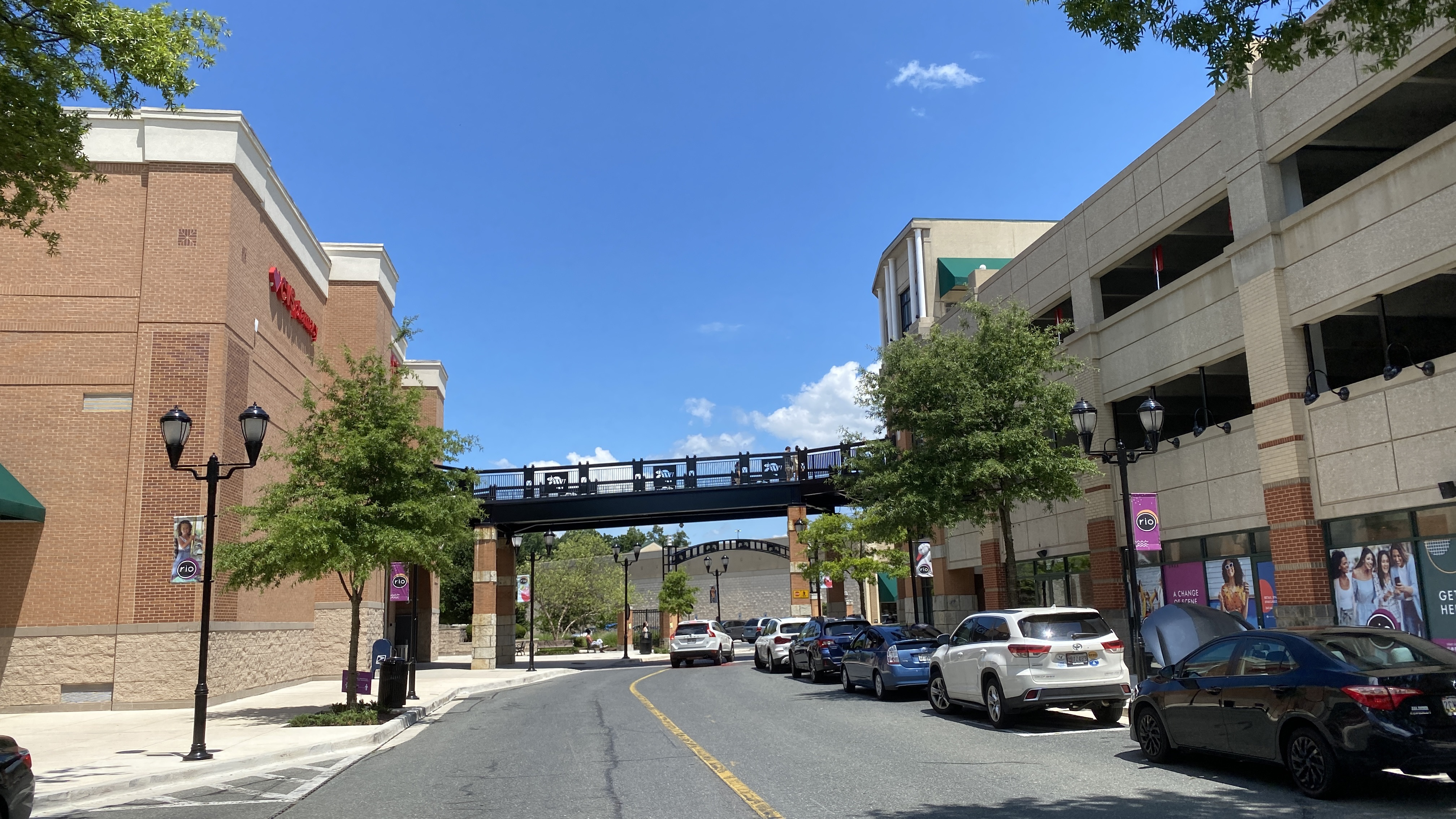

== Elevators in Service ==
Location	Elevator Type	Floors Served	Fixtures	Notes
Washingtonian Center/Sodexo Building Garage	TKE H-Power	1, *2, 3, 4, 5	Innovation Universal	Originally an OTIS Series 1
Washingtonian Center (Main)	OTIS Gen2	*1, 2, 3, (4)	Series N2	Originally a Series 1 and served 1-3. Extended to 4 and completely replaced. Floor 4 is locked due to a lack of something on that floor.
Washingtonian Center (Exterior Service)	OTIS LRV	*G, 2, 3	Series 1	Original to the shopping center. Next to the entrance roadway to Garage A. In questionable condition.
Garage A	4x ThyssenKrupp SPFs	*1, 2, 3, 4, 5, 6	TK VR	Often broken and in questionable condition.
Garage A (Side)	ThyssenKrupp Oildraulic	*1, 2, 3, 4, 5	TK VR	Standalone elevator, does not serve the 6th floor.
Courtyard by Marriott	2x KONE EcoSystems	*L, 2, 3, 4, 5, 6, 7, 8, 9	Series 220	
Garage B	Schindler 300A	1, *2, 3, 4	MT Vandal-Resistant	
Dick's Sporting Goods	MontgomeryKONE MX Hydraulic	*1, (1M), 2, (2M)	Innovation Universal	M-Floors for staff only. In questionable condition. Has a really loud floor pass beep.
Garage C	3x KONE HydroMods	*1, 2, 3, 4	Monitor TR	Originally Montgomery Elevators, modded in the late 2010's.
Garage C (Side)	Montgomery Hydraulic	*1, 2, 3, 4	Adams Classic	Not modernized along with the main cars.
Target	2x KONE/MEI Hydraulics	*1, 2	Innovation Bruiser	Originally MontgomeryKONEs, modded at some point.
Kohl's	2x Schindler 300As	*1, 2	MT	
