= Reduced level =

Surveying terminololgy

In surveying, reduced level (RL) refers to equating elevations of survey points with reference to a common assumed vertical datum. It is a vertical distance between survey point and adopted datum surface. Thus, it is considered as the base level which is used as reference to reckon heights or depths of other places or structures in that area, region or country. The word "Reduced" here means "equating" and the word "level" means "elevation". Datum may be a real or imaginary location with a nominated elevation.

== Datum used ==
The most common and convenient datum which is internationally accepted is mean sea level which is a universal measure and based upon a common base line in the whole world determined by the earth's gravitational model (see geoid) that gives the standard to measure elevation of a place above or below mean sea level.

Countries adopt their nearby mean sea levels as datum planes for calculations of reduced levels in their respective jurisdictions. For example, Pakistan takes sea near Karachi as its datum while India takes sea near Mumbai as its datum for calculation of reduced levels. The term reduced level is denoted shortly by 'RL'. National survey departments of each country determine RLs of significantly important locations or points. These points are called permanent benchmarks and this survey process is known as Great Trigonometrical Surveying (GTS). The permanent benchmarks act as reference points for determining RLs of other locations in a particular country.

== Instruments ==
The instruments used to determine reduced level include:

- Optical levelling instruments like automatic level, Y level, dumpy level, or Cooke's reversible level
- Levelling staff
- Tripod stand

== RL calculation ==
RL of a survey point can be determined by two methods:

1. Height of instrument method
2. Rise and fall method

== Significance ==
1. For drainage of water under gravity a suitable slope is required. Thus, roads are built in the fashion that their RL's on sides are comparatively smaller than the RL at the mid-span of the road. This ensures proper drainage of water from roads.
2. For construction of buildings, roads, and dams, a horizontal levelled surface is required. So, at construction sites, RLs of different points are obtained. The ground surface is then being levelled to the RL, which is obtained by taking the arithmetic mean of RLs of different points.
3. Reduced Levels are used heavily in underground mining applications, referencing an area within the mine's vertical depth from the surface, as opposed to Mean sea level.
