= Benchmark (surveying) =

Point with known height used in surveying when levelling

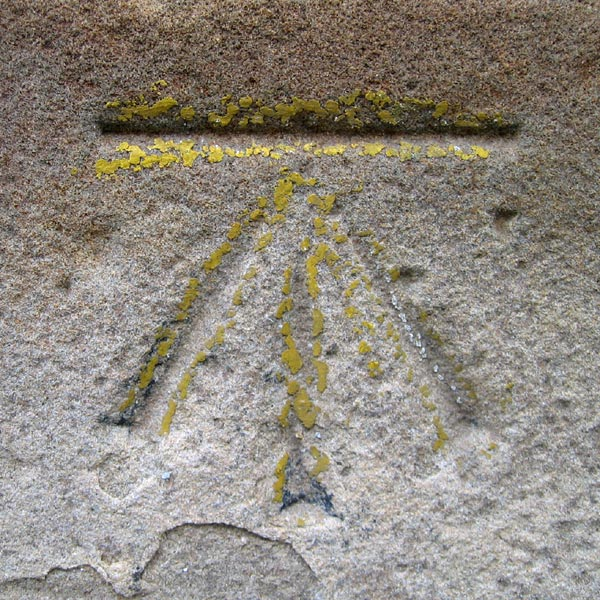
An Ordnance Survey cut mark in the UK

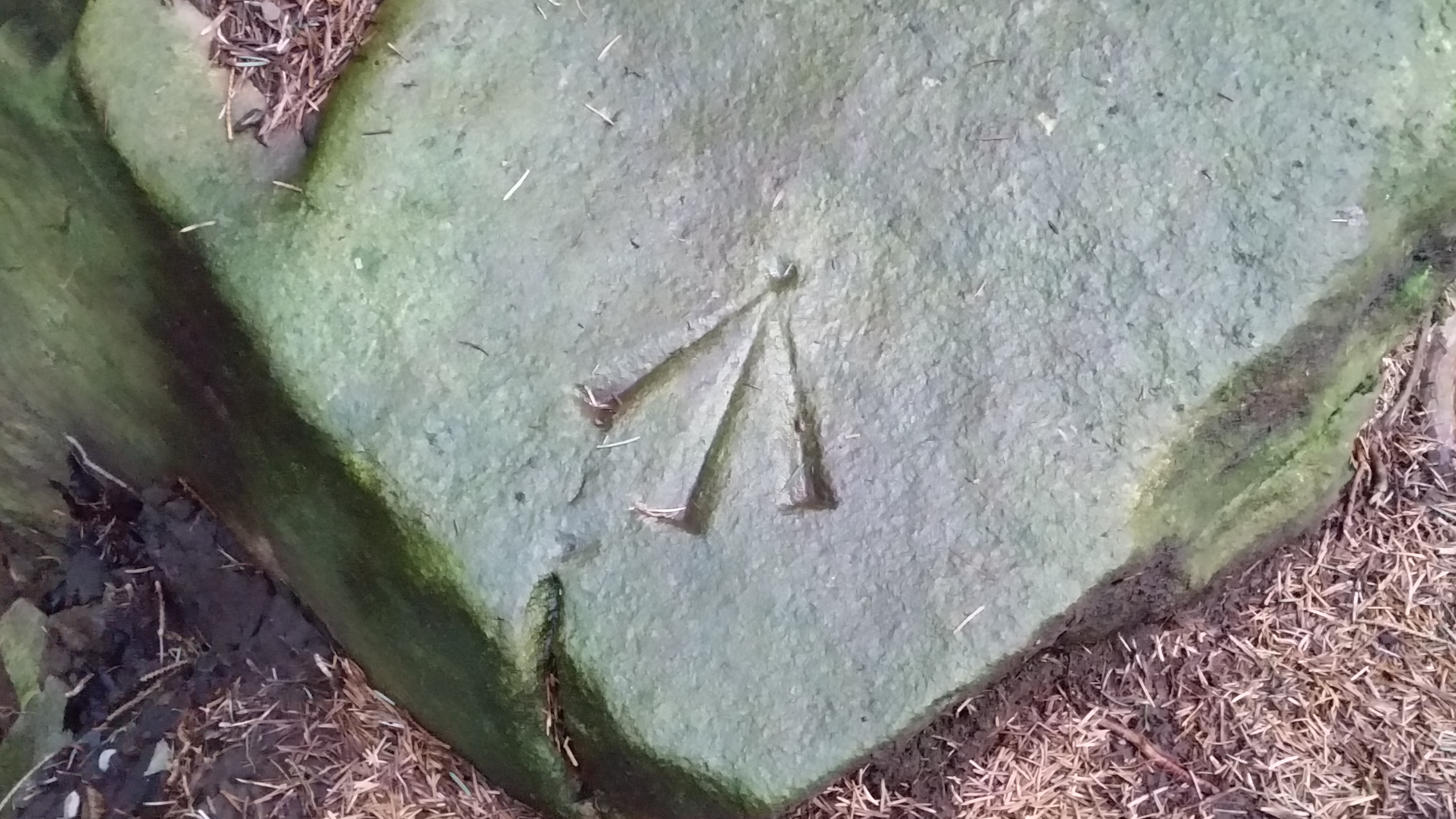
Occasionally a non-vertical face, and a slightly different mark, was used

The term benchmark, bench mark, or survey benchmark originates from the chiseled horizontal marks that surveyors made in stone structures, into which an angle iron could be placed to form a "bench" for a leveling rod, thus ensuring that a leveling rod could be accurately repositioned in the same place in the future. These marks were usually indicated with a chiseled arrow – specifically a broad arrow – below the horizontal line. A benchmark is a type of survey marker.

The term is generally applied to any item used to mark a point as an elevation reference. Frequently, bronze or aluminum disks are set in stone or concrete, or on rods driven deeply into the earth to provide a stable elevation point. If an elevation is marked on a map, but there is no physical mark on the ground, it is a spot height.

== Purpose ==
The height of a benchmark is calculated relative to the heights of nearby benchmarks in a network extending from a fundamental benchmark. A fundamental benchmark is a point with a precisely known relationship to the vertical datum of the area, typically mean sea level. The position and height of each benchmark are shown on large-scale maps.

The terms "height" and "elevation" are often used interchangeably, but in many jurisdictions, they have specific meanings; "height" commonly refers to a local or relative difference in the vertical (such as the height of a building), whereas "elevation" refers to the difference from a nominated reference surface (such as sea-level, or a mathematical/geodetic model that approximates the sea level known as the geoid). Elevation may be specified as normal height (above a reference ellipsoid), orthometric height, or dynamic height which have slightly different definitions.

== Other types of survey marks ==
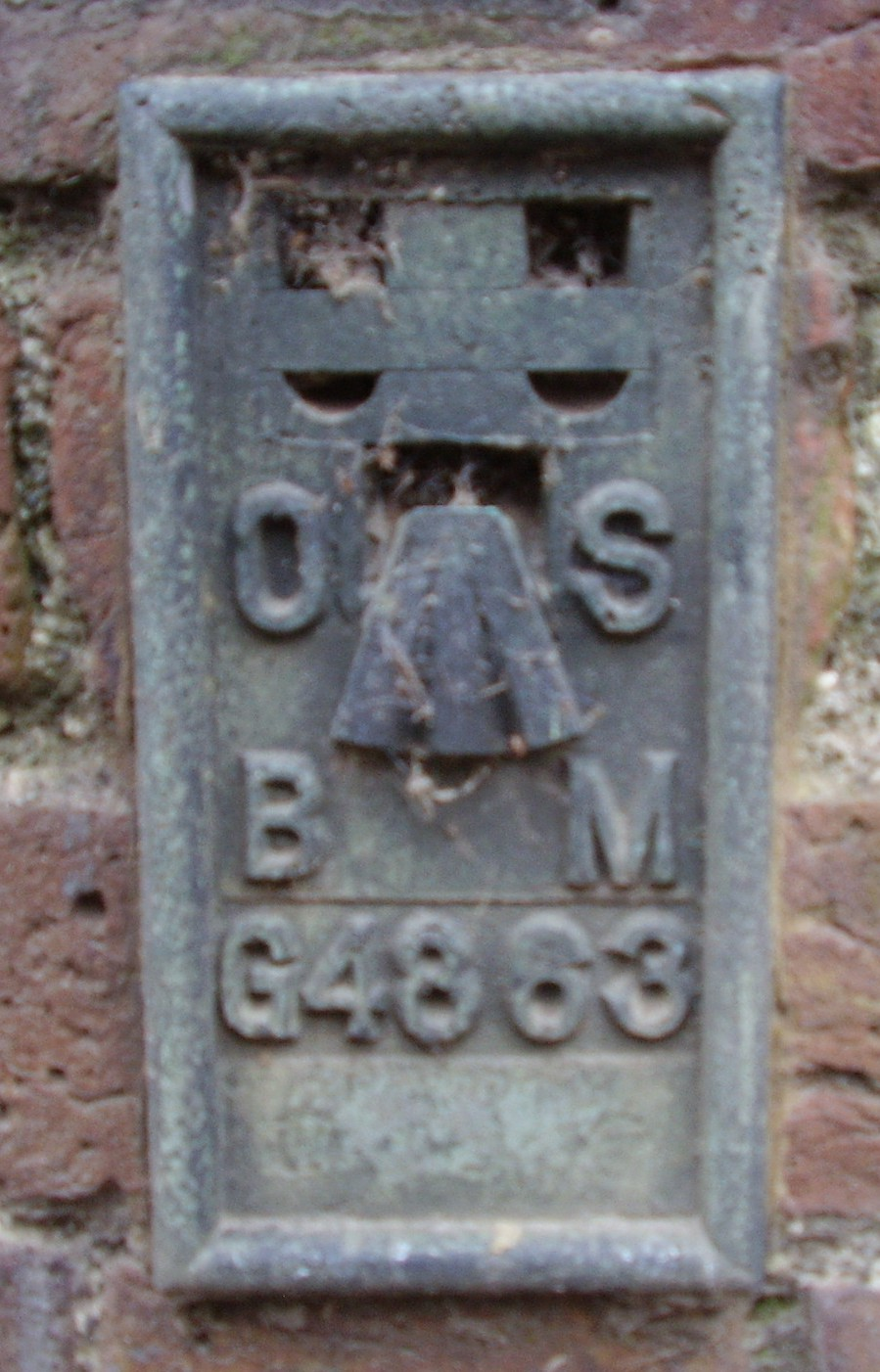
An Ordnance Survey flush bracket located at 182 Mongeham Road in Deal

Triangulation points, also known as trig points, are marks with a precisely established horizontal position. These points may be marked by disks similar to benchmark disks, but set horizontally, and are also sometimes used as elevation benchmarks. Prominent features on buildings such as the tip of a church spire or a chimney stack are also used as reference points for triangulation. In the United Kingdom, triangulation points are often set in large concrete markers that, as well as functioning as triangulation points, have a benchmark set into the side. With the increasing use of GPS and electronic distance measuring devices, the same techniques and equipment are used to fix the horizontal and vertical position of a survey marker at the same moment, and therefore the marks are usually regarded as "fixed in three dimensions".

Flush brackets are metal plates placed flush into the faces of buildings or other structures. Although many are attached to triangulation pillars as above, Non-Pillar Flush Brackets were also frequently located in the faces of buildings.

== Agencies responsible for benchmarks ==
Benchmarks are typically placed ("monumented") by a government agency or private survey firm, and many governments maintain a register of these marks so that the records are available to all. These records are usually in the form of a geographically searchable database (computer or map-based), with links to sketches, diagrams, photos of the marks, and any other technical details.

A USGS bench mark disk embedded in bedrock at 37°10'45.3"N 86°06'32.0"W, Mammoth Cave National Park, Kentucky; the blank elevation field and "Write the Director, Washington D.C." inscription indicate a late 19th or early 20th century marker, predating standardized pre-stamped survey disks.

Government agencies that place and maintain records of benchmarks include:

- Canada
  - Natural Resources Canada (Geodetic Survey Division)
- Denmark
  - GST (Danish: Geodatastyrelsen)
- France
  - Institut Géographique National (IGN on Wiki FR).
- India
  - Survey of India
- Morocco
  - ANCFCC
- Republic of Ireland
  - Ordnance Survey Ireland
- Italy
  - Istituto Geografico Militare
- Japan
  - Geospatial Information Authority of Japan (GSI)
- Netherlands
  - Netherlands Partnership Geodetic Infrastructure (NSGI)
    - Rijkswaterstaat (vertical)
    - Kadaster (horizontal)
- New Zealand
  - Land Information New Zealand
- Pakistan
  - Survey of Pakistan
- South Africa
  - Department of Rural Development and Land Reform
- Spain
  - Instituto Geográfico Nacional (IGN)
- United Kingdom
  - Ordnance Survey
  - Ordnance Survey of Northern Ireland
- United States
  - The National Geodetic Survey (NGS; formerly United States Coast and Geodetic Survey)
  - The United States Army Corps of Engineers (USACE)
  - The United States Forest Service
  - The United States Geological Survey (USGS)

== Notable benchmarks ==
- The brass benchmark in the Amsterdam Stopera (combined city hall and opera house) is a tourist attraction, since the benchmark below the Dam square, which has been used for the zero level of Normaal Amsterdams Peil (NAP) in the Netherlands, is concealed by a manhole cover. The latter benchmark has been used also for the national zero level of other countries in northwest Europe as well as for the European Vertical Reference System (EVRS).
- Benchmark A in Washington, D.C. is miniature replica of the Washington Monument. Installed in the late 1800s, this benchmark was used during the construction of the Monument and in subsequent surveys performed by the NGS. Upon completion of the monument grounds, Benchmark A was buried in a brick-lined pit and concealed by a manhole cover. In 2019, the "mini monument" was unveiled to the public for a brief time before being covered back up again.

== Image gallery ==
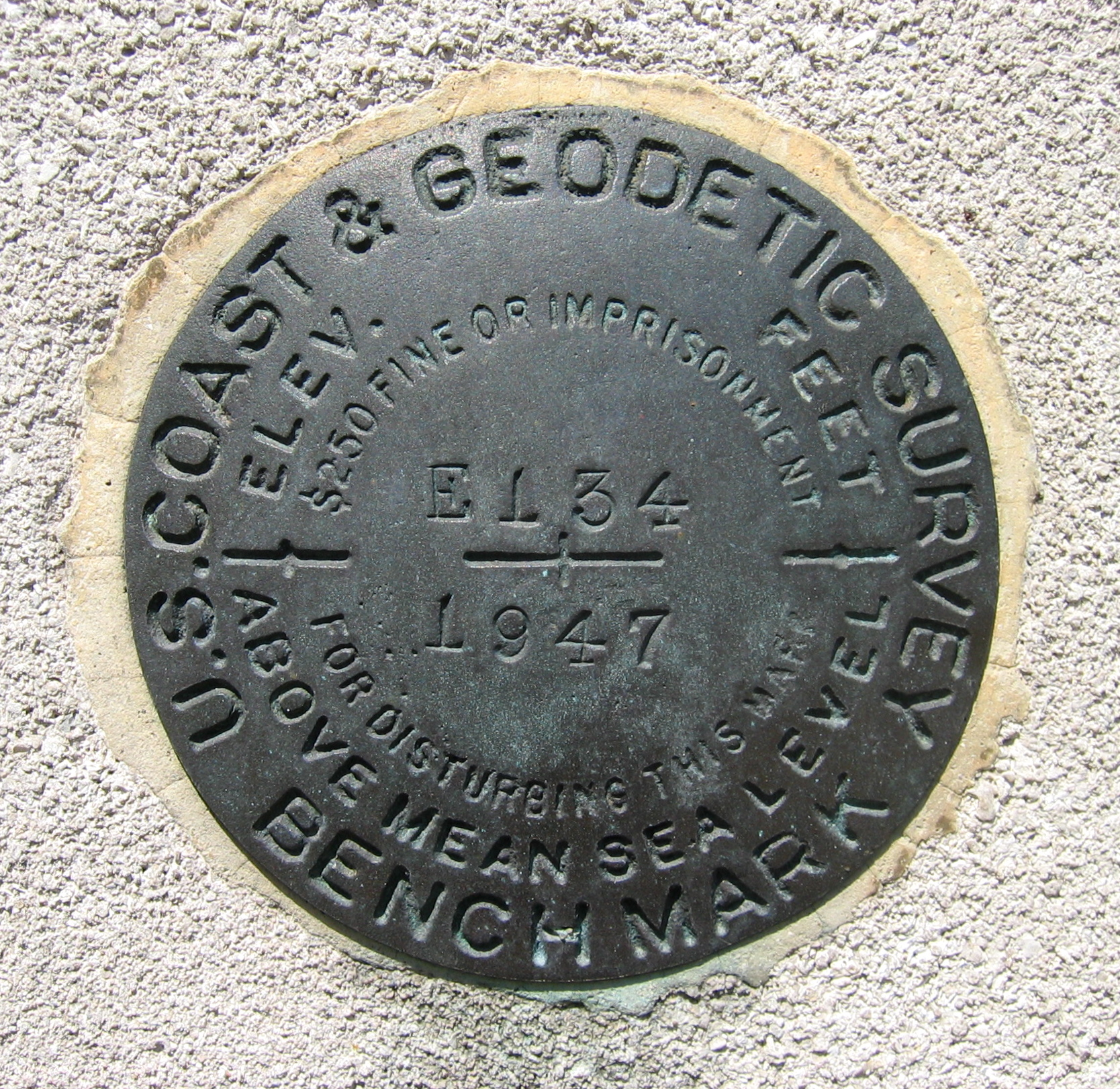
United States Coast and Geodetic Survey benchmark disk in the United States

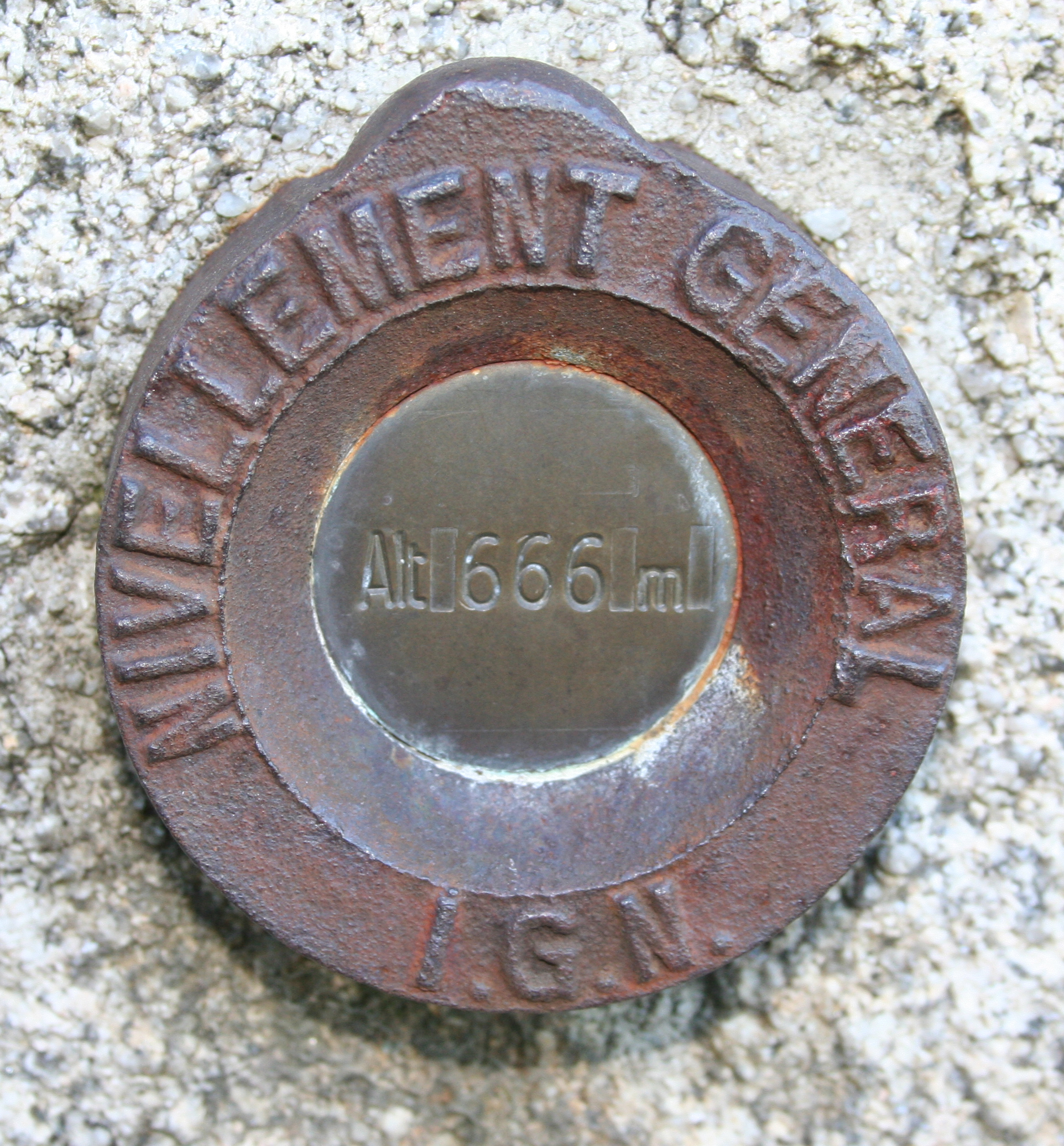
Bench mark at Saint Goussaud, Limousin, France, by Institut Géographique National

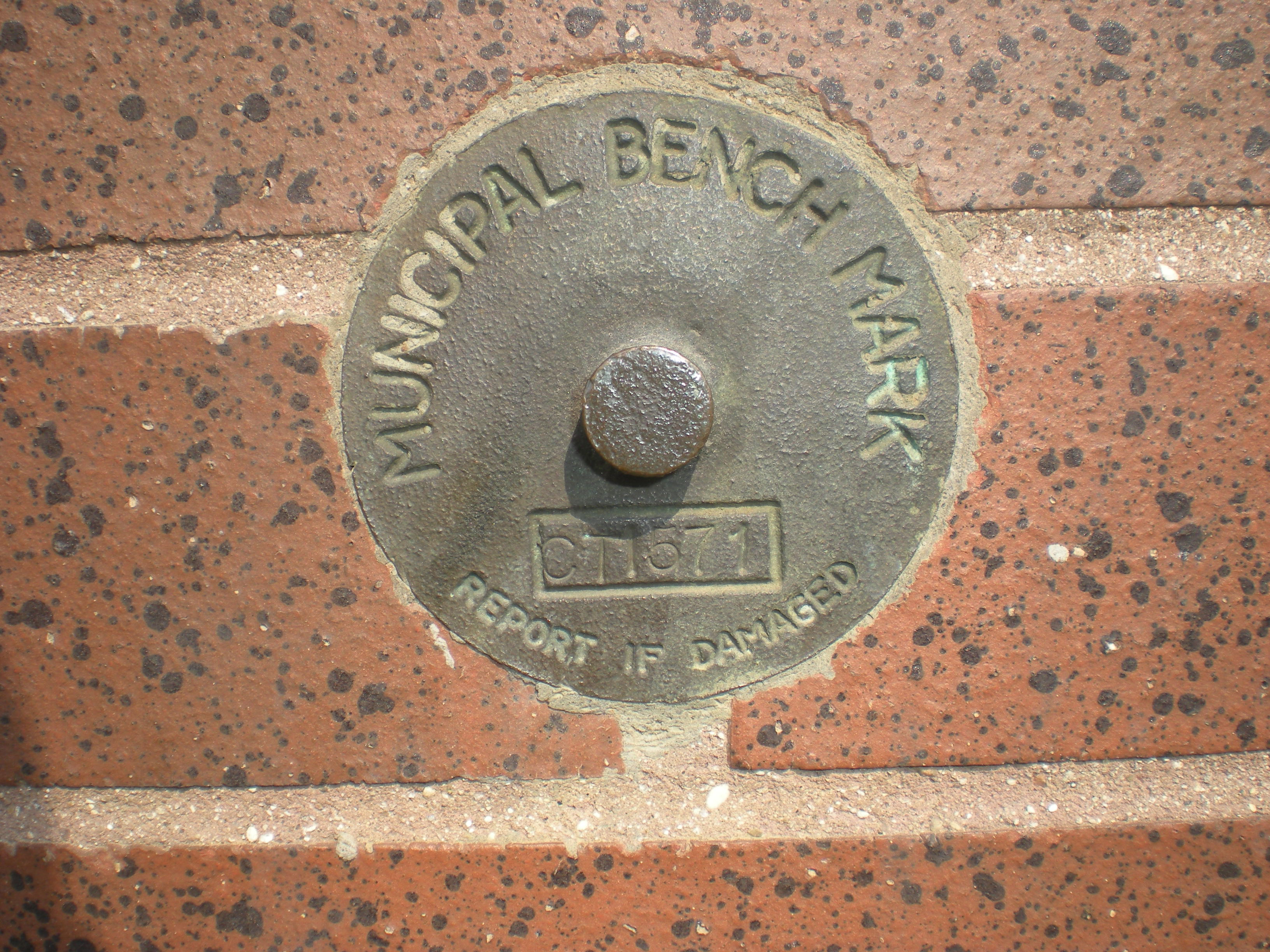
City of Toronto benchmark disk in Canada

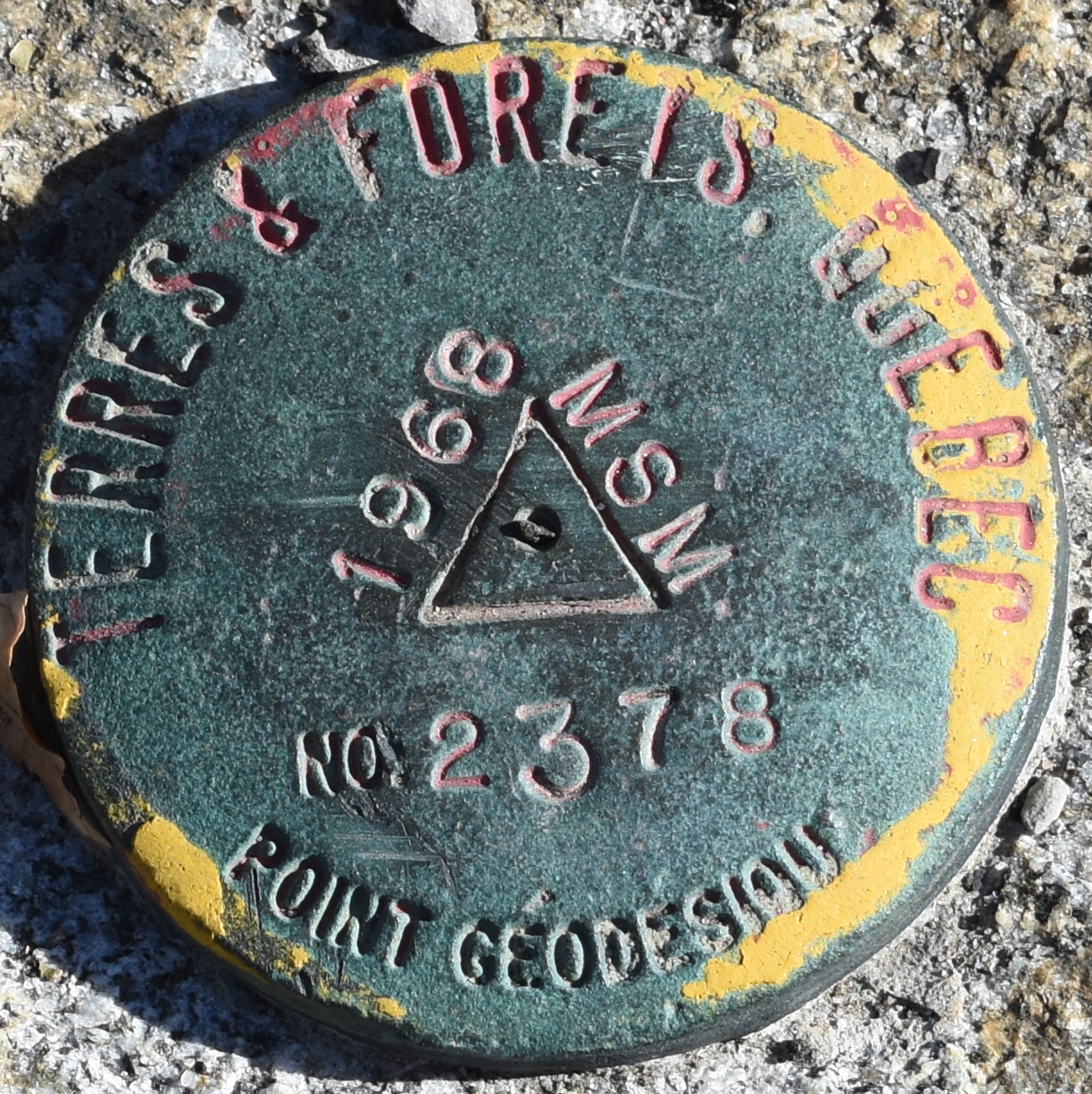
Benchmark disk in Ottawa, Ontario, Canada

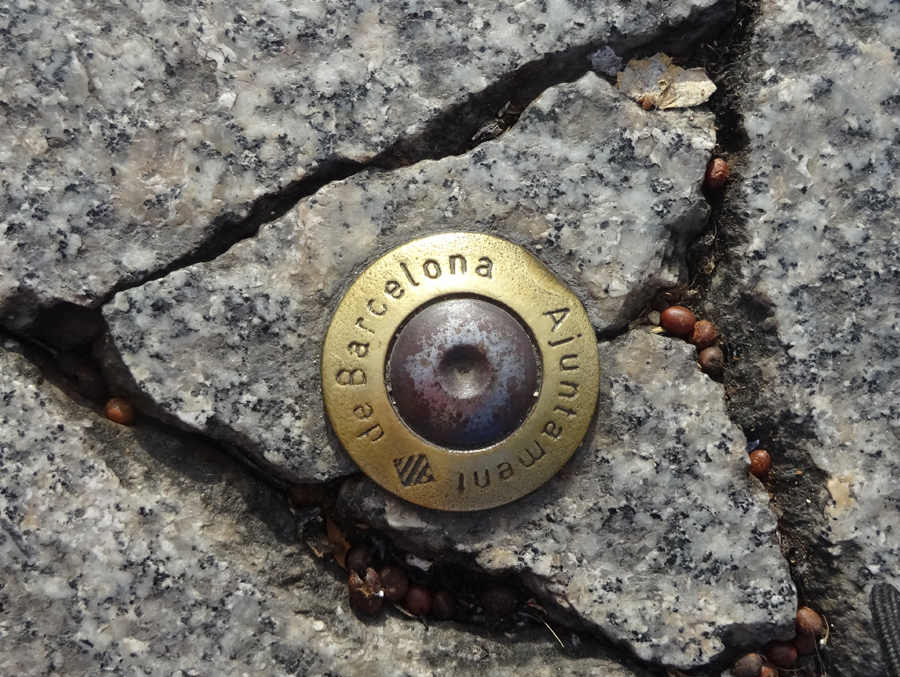
Vial Moll de Bosch i Alsina, near Port de Barcelona building, & pedestrian crossing Barcelona

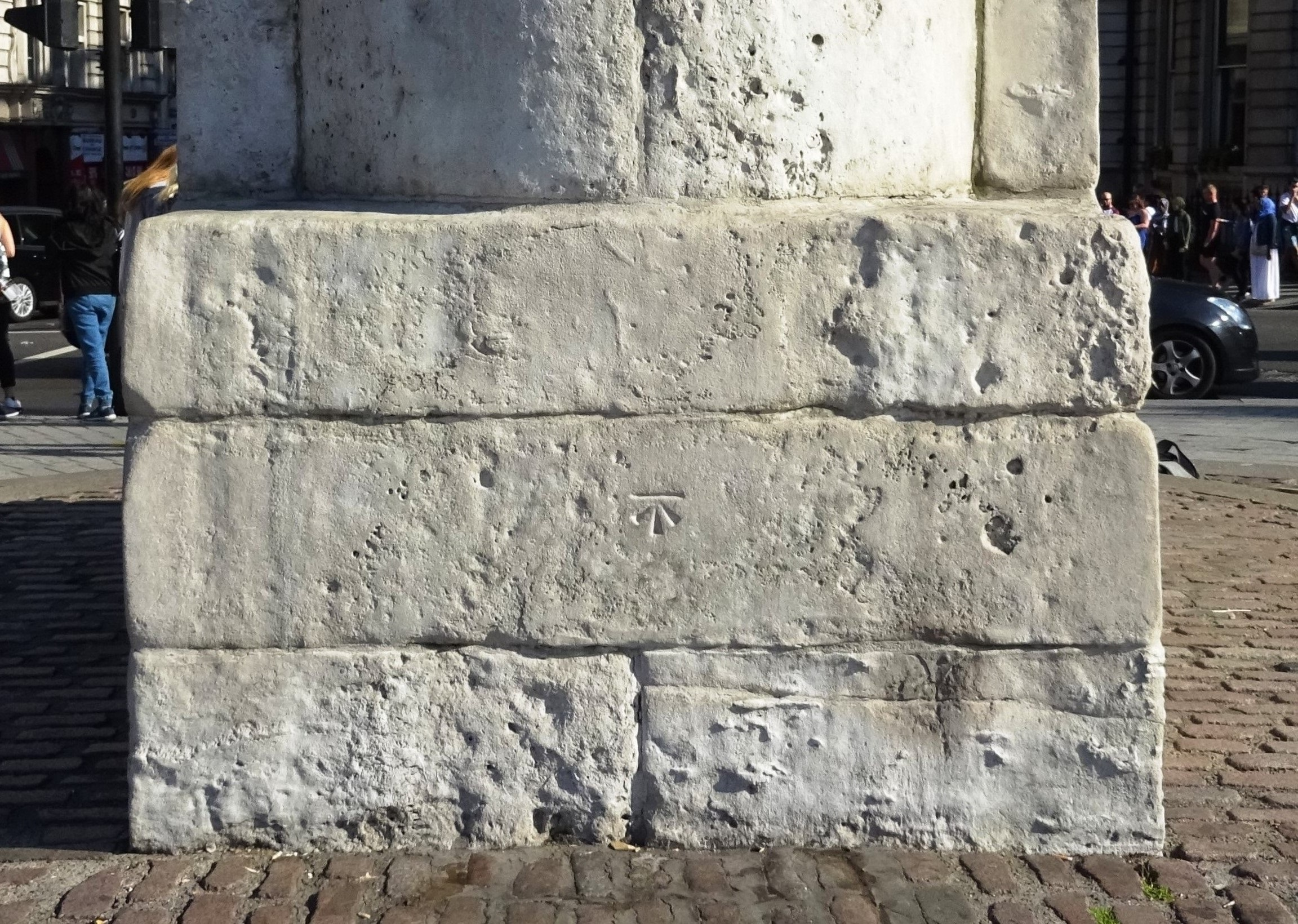
Benchmark on the plinth of the statue of King Charles I in Trafalgar Square, London: the site of the medieval Charing Cross, and the point from which distances from London are calculated

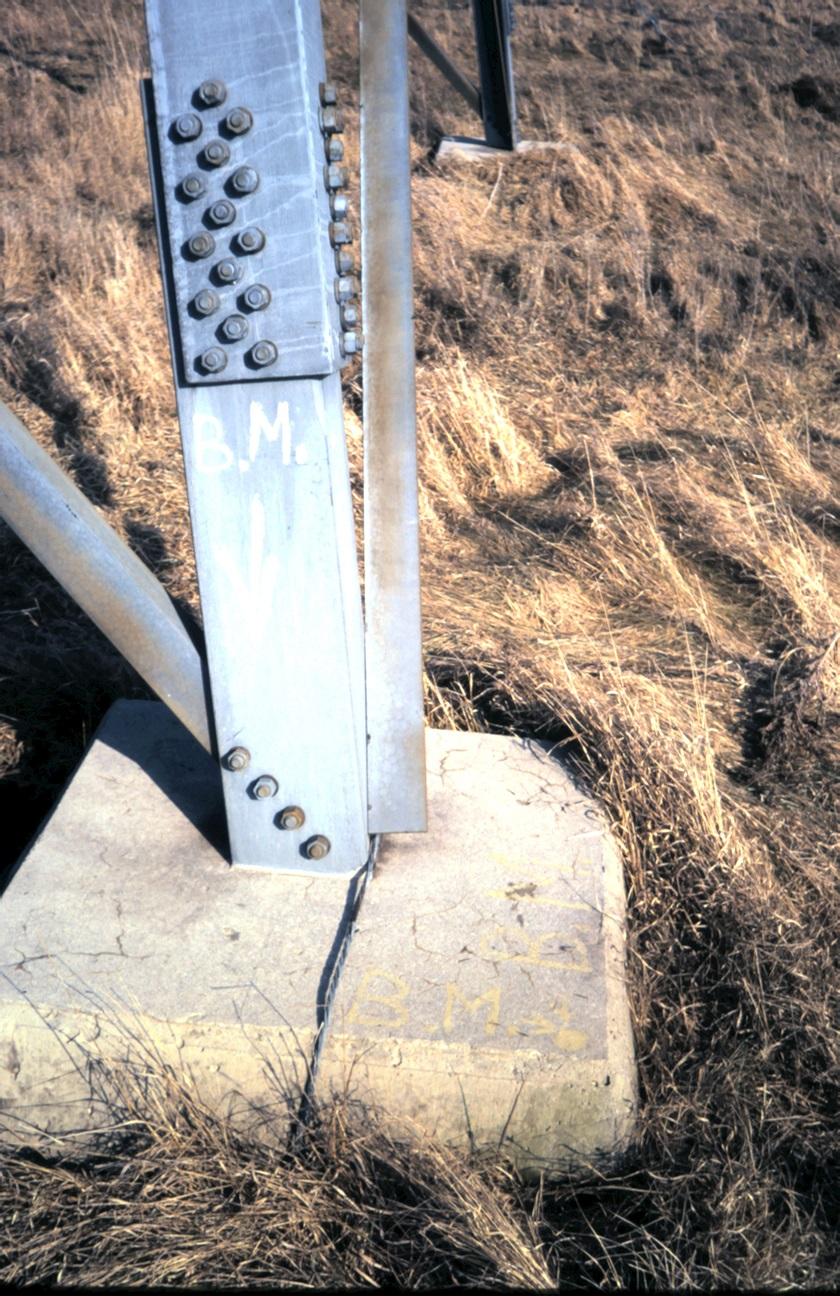
Benchmark painted on an electricity pylon's foundation

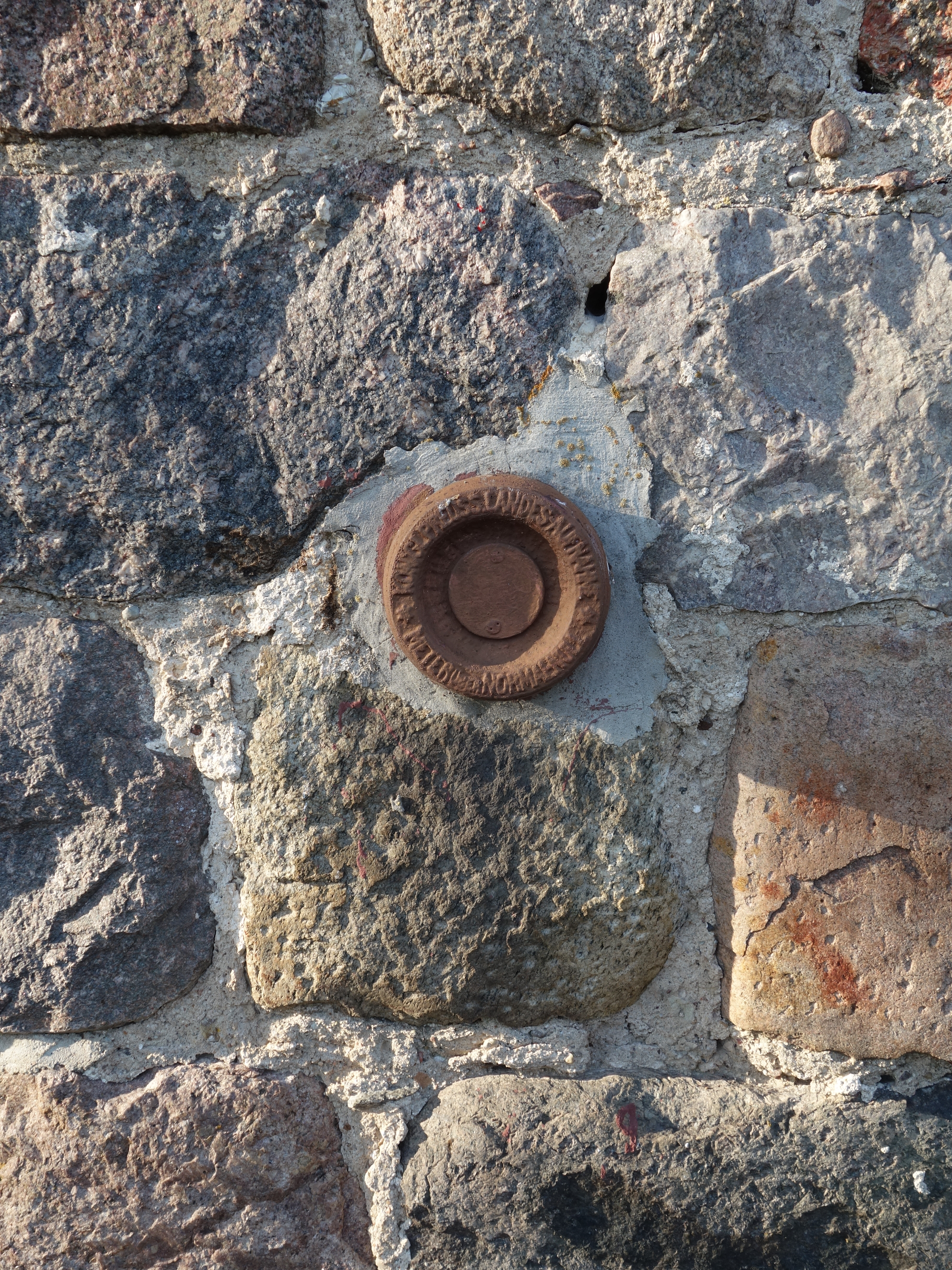
Benchmark of the Prussian Survey Authority on a church in Brandenburg

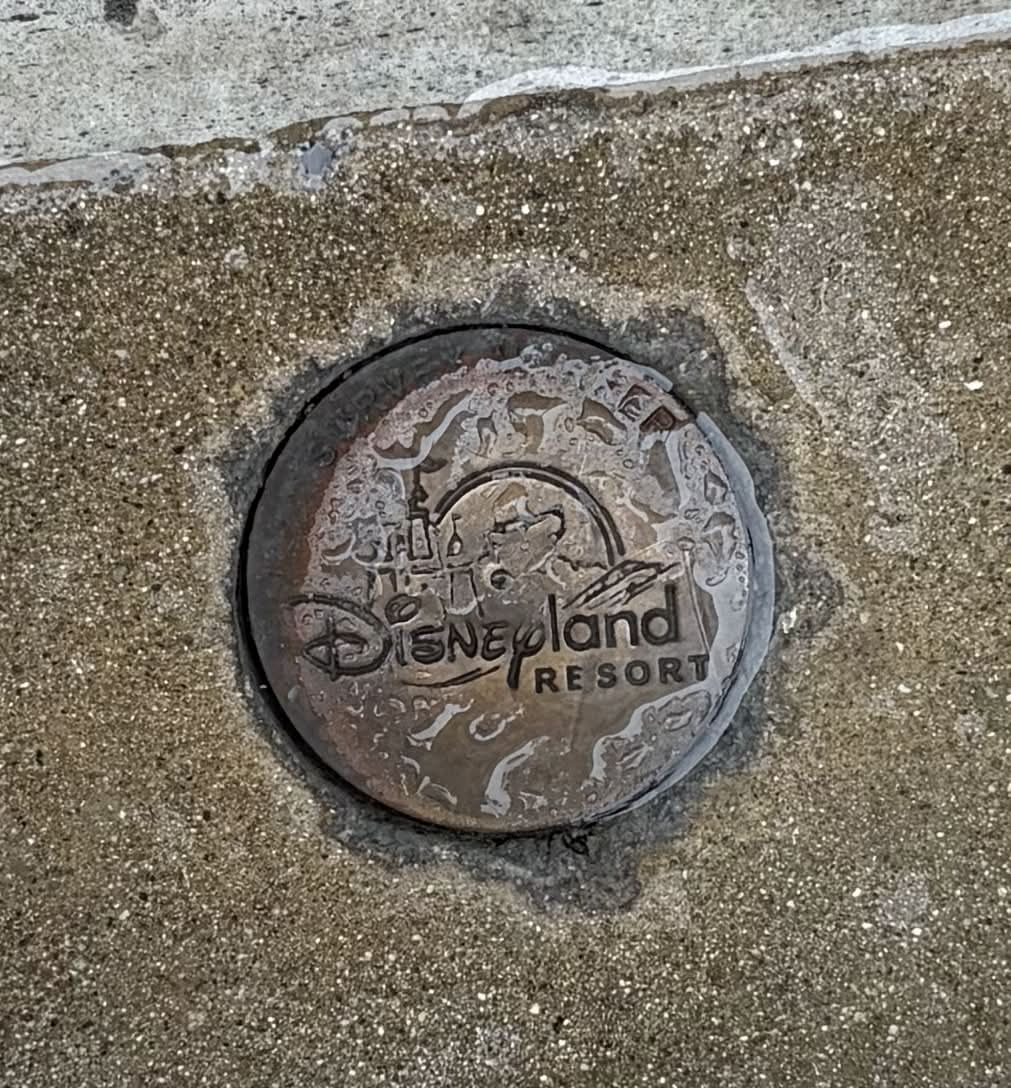
Benchmark in Disney's California Adventure

== See also ==
- Benchmarking—a recreational activity in which participants search for benchmarks using a handheld GPS receiver.
- Broad arrow
- Geoid
- Levelling—a surveying technique that uses benchmarks
- Ordnance datum
- Spot height
