= Vertical position =

Position along a vertical direction above or below a given vertical datum

Vertical position or vertical location is a position along a vertical direction (the plumb line direction) above or below a given vertical datum (a reference level surface, such as mean sea level). Vertical distance or vertical separation is the distance between two vertical positions. Many vertical coordinates exist for expressing vertical position: depth, height, altitude, elevation, etc. Points lying on an equigeopotential surface are said to be on the same vertical level, as in a water level. A function with domain along the vertical line is called a vertical distribution or vertical profile.

== Definitions ==
The International Organization for Standardization (ISO), more specifically ISO 19111, offers the following two definitions:

- depth: "distance of a point from a chosen reference surface measured downward along a line perpendicular to that surface."
- height: "distance of a point from a chosen reference surface measured upward along a line perpendicular to that surface";

ISO 6709 (2008 version) makes the following additional definition:

- altitude: "height where the chosen reference surface is mean sea level"

The International Civil Aviation Organization (ICAO) offers similar definitions:

- altitude: "the vertical distance of a level, a point or an object considered as a point, measured from the mean sea level (MSL);"
- height: "the vertical distance of a level, a point or an object considered as a point, measured from a specific datum."

ICAO further defines:

- elevation: "the vertical distance of a point or a level, on or affixed to the surface of the earth, measured from mean sea level."

I.e., elevation would be the altitude of an earth-bound feature, such as the ground or a building.

=== Derived quantities ===
Several physical quantities may be defined based on the definitions above:

- Depth below seafloor
- Depth in a well
- Drying height
- Dynamic height
- Ellipsoidal height
- Geocentric altitude
- Geopotential
- Height above mean sea level
- Height above average terrain
- Height above ground level
- Measured depth
- Normal height
- Orthometric height
- Thickness (geology)
- True vertical depth

=== Units ===
Vertical distance quantities, such as orthometric height, may be expressed in various units: metres, feet, etc.

Certain vertical coordinates are not based on length, for example, geopotential numbers have units of m^{2}/s^{2}. Normalization by a constant nominal gravity value (units of m/s^{2}) yields units of metre, as in geopotential height (based on standard gravity) or dynamic height (based on normal gravity at 45 degrees latitude). Despite the physical dimension and unit of length, the vertical coordinate does not represent distance in physical space, as would be measured with a ruler or tape measure. Sometimes a geopotential metre (symbol gpm or m') or dynamic metre is introduced for emphasis. However, this practice is not acceptable with the International System of Units (SI). (Note: The Guide for the Use of the International System of Units, section 7.5 (Unacceptability of mixing information with units), states: When one gives the value of a quantity, any information concerning the quantity or its conditions of measurement must be presented in such a way as not to be associated with the unit.)

Another non-SI unit is the vertical metre, introduced when there may be confusion between vertical, horizontal, or slant distances. It is used for distance climbed during sports such as mountaineering, skiing, hiking, running or cycling. In German-speaking countries the abbreviation 'Hm' for Höhenmeter ("height metre") is used; if it is preceded by a '±' it refers to the cumulative elevation gain.

== Determination ==
Various instruments and techniques may be used for measuring or determining vertical position:

- Altimeter
- Bathymetry
- Benchmark (surveying)
- Depth gauge
- Depth sounding
- Hypsometer
- Topography
- Tide gauge
- Water level (device)

== Phenomena ==
Many physical phenomena are related to vertical position, as driven by gravity:

- Hydraulic head
  - Stage (hydrology)
- Isostasy
- Mean sea level
  - Geoid
  - Sea surface height
- Temperature lapse rate
- Terrain
  - Digital terrain model
  - Topographic prominence
- Vertical displacement
  - Post-glacial rebound
  - Subsidence
  - Tectonic uplift
- Vertical pressure variation

== See also ==
- Chart datum
- Geodesy § Heights
- Geographic coordinates
- Horizontal position
- Hypsometry
- Physical geodesy
- Vertical and horizontal
- Vertical separation (aviation)
- Water level
