= North American Vertical Datum of 1988 =

Vertical datum for orthometric heights

Illustration of vertical datums in the United States

The North American Vertical Datum of 1988 (NAVD 88) is the vertical datum for orthometric heights established for vertical control surveying in the United States based upon the General Adjustment of the North American Datum of 1988.

It superseded the National Geodetic Vertical Datum of 1929 (NGVD 29), previously known as the Sea Level Datum of 1929.

NAVD 88, along with North American Datum of 1983 (NAD 83, a horizontal datum), is set to be replaced in 2025 with a new geometric reference frame and geopotential datum, based on GPS and gravimetric geoid models.

== Methodology ==
NAVD 88 was established in 1991 by the minimum-constraint adjustment of geodetic leveling observations in Canada, the United States, and Mexico. It held fixed the height of the primary tide gauge benchmark, referenced to the International Great Lakes Datum of 1985 local mean sea level (MSL) height value, at Rimouski, Quebec, Canada. Additional tidal bench mark elevations were not used due to the demonstrated variations in sea surface topography, i.e., that MSL is not the same equipotential surface at all tidal bench marks.

North American Vertical Datum of 1988 (NAVD 88) consists of a leveling network on the North American Continent, ranging from Alaska, through Canada, across the United States, affixed to a single origin point on the continent.

In 1993 NAVD 88 was affirmed as the official vertical datum in the National Spatial Reference System (NSRS) for the Conterminous United States and Alaska. (see Federal Register Notice (FRN)). Although many papers on NAVD 88 exist, no single document serves as the official defining document for that datum.

The definition of NAVD 88 uses the Helmert orthometric height, which calculates the location of the geoid (which approximates MSL) from modeled local gravity. The NAVD 88 model is based on then-available measurements, and remains fixed despite later improved geoid models.

Since NGVD 29 used a simple model of gravity based on latitude to calculate the geoid and did not take into account other variations, elevation difference between points in a local area in it and NAVD 88 will show negligible change from one datum to the other, even though the elevation of both does change between datums.

== Datum of 2022 ==
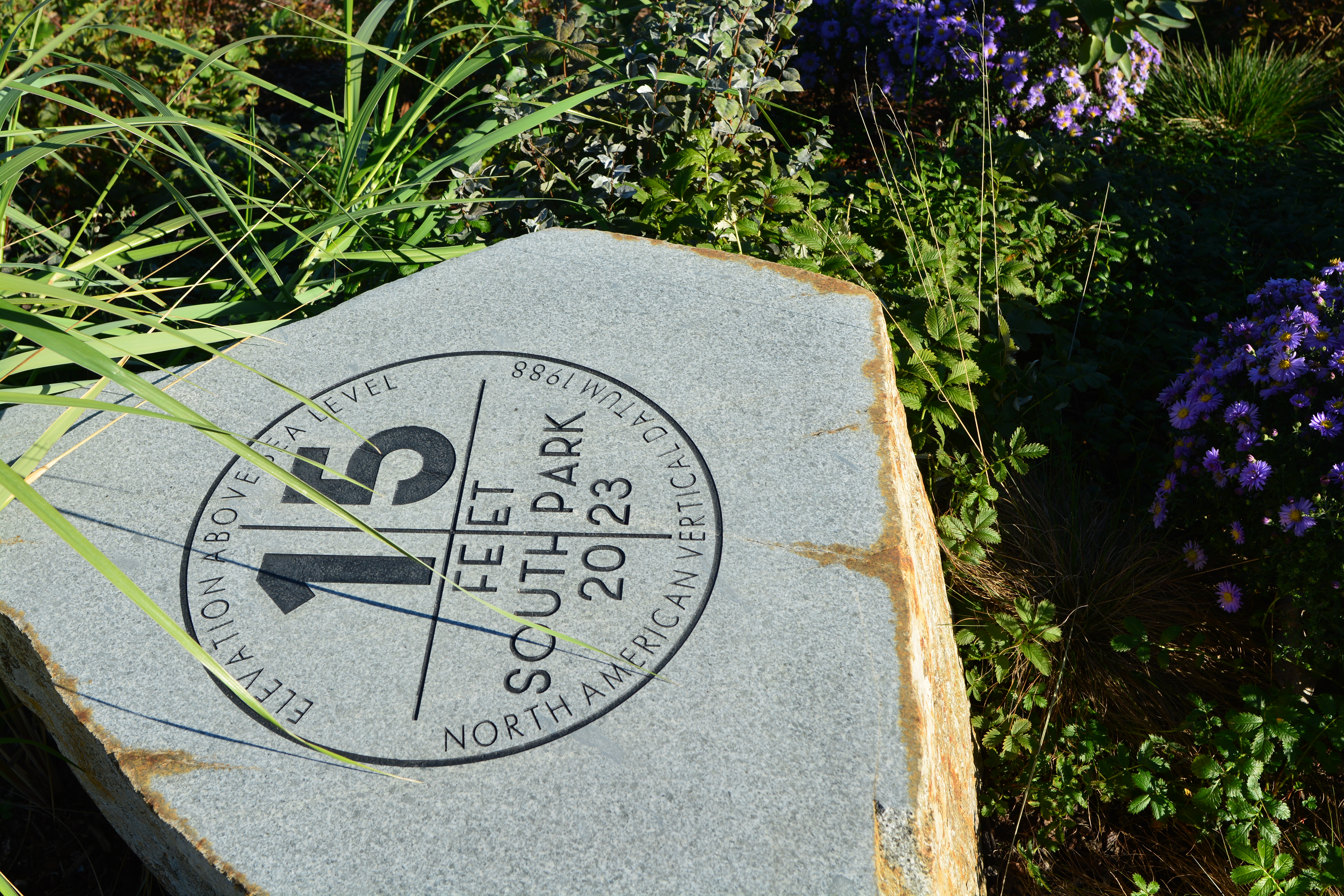
An unusual vertical datum marker at a shoreline street end in Seattle

Based on the more recent surveying techniques and data, it was determined that NAVD 88 is both biased (by about 0.5 meters (1 ft 8 in)) and tilted (about 1 meter (3 ft 3 in) coast to coast). To improve the National Spatial Reference System (NSRS), the National Geodetic Service will replace the North American Datum of 1983 (NAD 83) and the North American Vertical Datum of 1988 (NAVD 88) with a new geometric reference frame and geopotential datum in 2025.

The new reference frames will rely primarily on Global Navigation Satellite Systems (GNSS), such as the Global Positioning System (GPS), as well as on a gravimetric geoid model resulting from NOAA's Gravity for the Redefinition of the American Vertical Datum (GRAV-D) Project. These new reference frames are intended to be easier to access, and maintain, than NAD 83 and NAVD 88, which rely on physical survey marks that deteriorate over time.

== See also ==
- Altitude
- Geodesy
- Sea Level Datum of 1929
- Topographic elevation
- Topography
- Reference ellipsoid
- Geoid
