= Vertical datum =

Reference surface for vertical positions

Vertical datums in Europe

In geodesy, surveying, hydrography and navigation, vertical datum or altimetric datum is a reference coordinate surface used for vertical positions, such as the elevations of Earth-bound features (terrain, bathymetry, water level, and built structures) and altitudes of satellite orbits and in aviation. In planetary science, vertical datums are also known as zero-elevation surface or zero-level reference.

Commonly adopted criteria for a vertical datum include the following approaches:

- Tides, based on sea level when specific conditions occur, such as NOAA's National Geodetic Survey-produced tidal datums;
- Gravimetric, based on a geoid; or geometric, based on the same Earth ellipsoids that are used in computing a horizontal datum, such as NOAA's planned gravimetric and Global Navigation Satellite Systems (GNSS)-based Datum of 2022 set to be released that year by the National Geodetic Survey.

== Methods ==
In common usage, elevations are often cited in height above sea level, although what "sea level" actually means is a more complex issue than might at first be thought: the height of the sea surface at any one place and time is a result of numerous effects, including waves, wind and currents, atmospheric pressure, tides, topography, and differences in the strength of gravity due to the presence of nearby ice sheets, mountains, and density variations in the crust and deep in the mantle.

For the purpose of measuring the height of objects on land, the usual datum used is mean sea level (MSL). This is a tidal datum which is described as the arithmetic mean of the hourly water elevation taken over a specific 19 years cycle. This definition averages out tidal highs and lows (caused by the gravitational effects of the sun and the moon) and short term variations. It will not remove the effects of local gravity strength, and so the height of MSL, relative to a geodetic datum, will vary around the world, and even around one country. Countries tend to choose the mean sea level at one specific point to be used as the standard "sea level" for all mapping and surveying in that country. (For example, in Great Britain, the national vertical datum, Ordnance Datum Newlyn, is based on what was mean sea level at Newlyn in Cornwall between 1915 and 1921). However, zero elevation as defined by one country is not the same as zero elevation defined by another (because MSL is not the same everywhere), which is why locally defined vertical datums differ from one another.

A different principle is used when choosing a datum for nautical charts. For safety reasons, a mariner must be able to know the minimum depth of water that could occur at any point. For this reason, depths and tides on a nautical chart are measured relative to chart datum, which is defined to be a level below which tide rarely falls. Exactly how this is chosen depends on the tidal regime in the area being charted and on the policy of the hydrographic office producing the chart in question; a typical definition is Lowest Astronomical Tide (the lowest tide predictable from the effects of gravity), or Mean Lower Low Water (the average lowest tide of each day), although MSL is sometimes used in waters with very low tidal ranges.

Conversely, if a ship is to safely pass under a low bridge or overhead power cable, the mariner must know the minimum clearance between the masthead and the obstruction, which will occur at high tide. Consequently, bridge clearances etc. are given relative to a datum based on high tide, such as Highest Astronomical Tide or Mean High Water Springs.

Sea level does not remain constant throughout geological time, and so tidal datums are less useful when studying very long-term processes. In some situations sea level does not apply at all – for instance for mapping Mars' surface – forcing the use of a different "zero elevation", such as mean radius.

A geodetic vertical datum takes some specific zero point, and computes elevations based on the geodetic model being used, without further reference to sea levels. Usually, the starting reference point is a tide gauge, so at that point the geodetic and tidal datums might match, but due to sea level variations, the two scales may not match elsewhere. An example of a gravity-based geodetic datum is NAVD88, used in North America, which is referenced to a point in Quebec, Canada. Ellipsoid-based datums such as WGS 84, GRS80 or NAD83 use a theoretical surface that may differ significantly from the geoid.

== Types ==
Common types of vertical datums include:

- The surface of the datum ellipsoid, resulting in an ellipsoidal height, h.
- The mean sea level as described by the gravity geoid, yielding the orthometric height, H.

Along with the latitude φ and longitude λ, the ellipsoidal height h provides the three-dimensional geodetic coordinates (or geographic coordinates) for a location.

So, to completely specify a location of a topographical feature on, in, or above the Earth, one also has to specify the vertical position. The Earth is not a sphere, but an irregular shape approximating a biaxial ellipsoid. It is nearly spherical, but has an equatorial bulge making the radius at the Equator about 0.3% larger than the radius measured through the poles. The shorter axis approximately coincides with the axis of rotation. Though early navigators thought of the sea as a horizontal surface that could be used as a vertical datum, this is not actually the case. The Earth has a series of layers of equal potential energy within its gravitational field. Height is a measurement at right angles to this surface, roughly toward the Earth's center, but local variations make the equipotential layers irregular (though roughly ellipsoidal). The choice of which layer to use for defining height is arbitrary.

== Examples ==
- Australia: Australian Height Datum
- Austria, Albania and former Yugoslavian republics: Metres above the Adriatic
- France: General levelling of France
- Germany: Normalhöhennull, preceded by Normalnull
- Great Britain: Ordnance Datum Newlyn
- Netherlands: Amsterdam Ordnance Datum, was also used by Prussia
- Switzerland: Metres above the Sea
- United States: National Geodetic Vertical Datum of 1929, North American Vertical Datum of 1988, and the difference of the two in VERTCON
- Global (geoid): Earth Gravitational Model (EGM), EIGEN-6C4 and others

== Chart datums ==
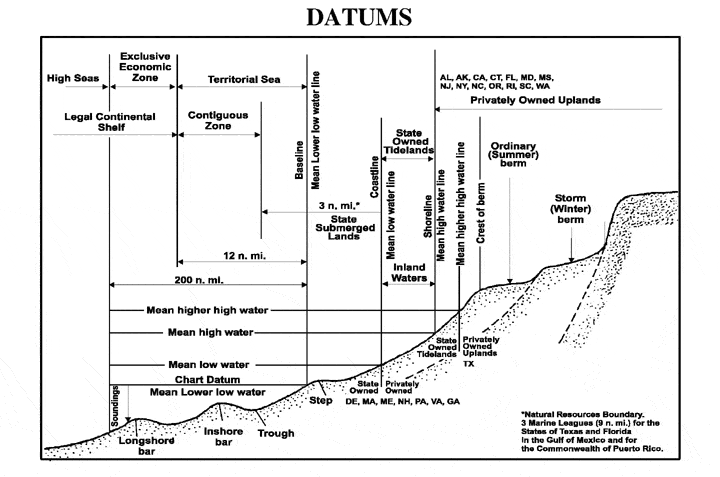
U.S. civil and maritime uses of tidal data

A chart datum is the water surface serving as origin (or coordinate surface) of depths displayed on a nautical chart and for reporting and predicting tide heights. A chart datum is generally derived from some tidal phase, in which case it is also known as a tidal datum. Common chart datums are lowest astronomical tide (LAT) and mean lower low water (MLLW). In non-tidal areas, e.g., the Baltic Sea, mean sea level (MSL) is used.

A chart datum is a type of vertical datum and must not be confused with the horizontal datum for the chart. However, it is not necessarily an equigeopotential (a water "level surface"): the chart datum is tilted across smaller to larger tidal range regions; in rivers, it is a sloping and undulating surface following the low stage.

== See also ==
- Datum reference
- Horizontal datum
- Levelling
- Reduced level
- Reference datum height
- Reference water levels
- Vertical Offshore Reference Frames
- Height above ground level
- Height above sea level
- Height above average terrain
