= RDH =

RDH may refer to:

== Transport ==
- Reference datum height, an aviation metric
- Redhill MRT station, Singapore (MRT code: RDH)
- Redhill railway station, Surrey, England (station code: RDH)

== Other uses ==
- Radiotron Designer's Handbook, a famous book by Wireless Press
- Registered Dental Hygienist
- Retinol dehydrogenase, an enzyme
- Royal Darwin Hospital, Northern Territory, Australia
