= National Geodetic Vertical Datum of 1929 =

Vertical datum in the United States

Illustration of vertical datums in the United States.

The National Geodetic Vertical Datum of 1929 (NGVD29), originally known as the Sea Level Datum of 1929, is the vertical datum established for vertical control surveying in the United States of America by the General Adjustment of 1929. NGVD29 was determined and published by the United States Coast and Geodetic Survey and is used to measure the elevation of a point above and below mean sea level (MSL).

NGVD29 was superseded by the North American Vertical Datum of 1988 (NAVD88), based upon reference to a single benchmark (referenced to the new International Great Lakes Datum of 1985 local mean sea level height value), although many cities and U.S. Army Corps of Engineers "legacy" projects with established data continued to use the older datum.

== Methodology ==
Mean sea level was measured at 26 tide gauges, 21 in the United States and five in Canada. The datum was defined by the observed heights of mean sea level at the 26 tide gauges and by the set of elevations of all bench marks resulting from the adjustment of observations. The adjustment required a total of 66,315 miles (106,724 km) of levelling with 246 closed circuits and 25 circuits at sea level.

Since the Sea Level Datum of 1929 was a best fitting surface model, it was not a pure model of mean sea level, the geoid, or any other equigeopotential surface. Therefore, it was renamed the National Geodetic Vertical Datum of 1929 (NGVD 29) May 10, 1973, by the National Geodetic Survey, a part of the National Oceanic and Atmospheric Administration.

== See also ==
- Altitude
- Elevation
- Geodetic datum
- Geodesy
- Geoid
- Mean sea level
- North American Vertical Datum of 1988
- Reference ellipsoid
- Topography
