= Drying height =

On a nautical chart, the drying height is the vertical distance of the seabed that is exposed by the tide, above the sea water level at the lowest astronomical tide.

On admiralty charts a drying height is distinguished from a depth by being underlined.
