= National Spatial Reference System =

NAD 83 & NAVD 88 based National Geodetic Coordinate System

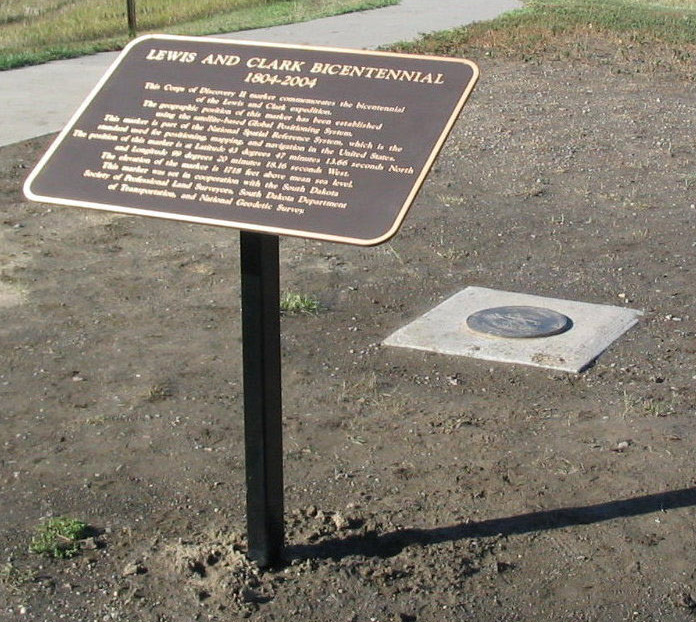
A survey marker (metal disk on square concrete pad) and commemorating plaque that is part of the NSRS.

The National Spatial Reference System (NSRS), managed by the National Geodetic Survey (NGS), is a coordinate system that includes latitude, longitude, elevation, and other values. The NSRS consists of a National Shoreline, the NOAA CORS Network (a system of Global Positioning System Continuously Operating Reference Stations), a network of permanently marked points, and a set of models that describe dynamic geophysical processes affecting spatial measurements. The system is currently based on the North American Datum of 1983 (NAD 83) and North American Vertical Datum of 1988 (NAVD88).

The North American-Pacific Geopotential Datum of 2022 (NAPGD2022) is a vertical datum set produced by the U.S. National Geodetic Survey to improve the NSRS. It will replace the NAVD88 with a new geopotential datum. In association with this release, a new, time-dependent geoid model, GEOID2022, will also be released. The release date for these models was planned for 2022 but they have been delayed.

The North American Terrestrial Reference Frame of 2022 (NATRF2022) is also planned as replacement for NAD83. NATRF2022 will be aligned to the International Terrestrial Reference Frame (ITRF) 2020.

== See also ==
- Altitude
- Sea Level Datum of 1929
- Topographic elevation
- Topography
- Reference ellipsoid
- Geoid
