= International Great Lakes Datum =

The International Great Lakes Datum (IGLD) is a vertical datum to be used in and around the Great Lakes and the St. Lawrence River. It is managed by the United States and Canada via the Great Lakes Coordinating Committee. It has three versions: IGLD 1955, IGLD 1985, and IGLD 2020 (expected to be released in 2027). It is based on dynamic heights with respect to the geoid. It must be updated to account for glacial isostatic adjustment in North America. It is to be used for hydraulics and hydrology: flood prediction, water levels recorded by tide gauges, etc. It is not to be used for hydrography: a chart datum will still be needed for representing bathymetry on nautical charts.
