= Amsterdam Ordnance Datum =

Vertical datum

Coordinates: 52°22′23″N 4°53′34″E

NAP markers in Amsterdam

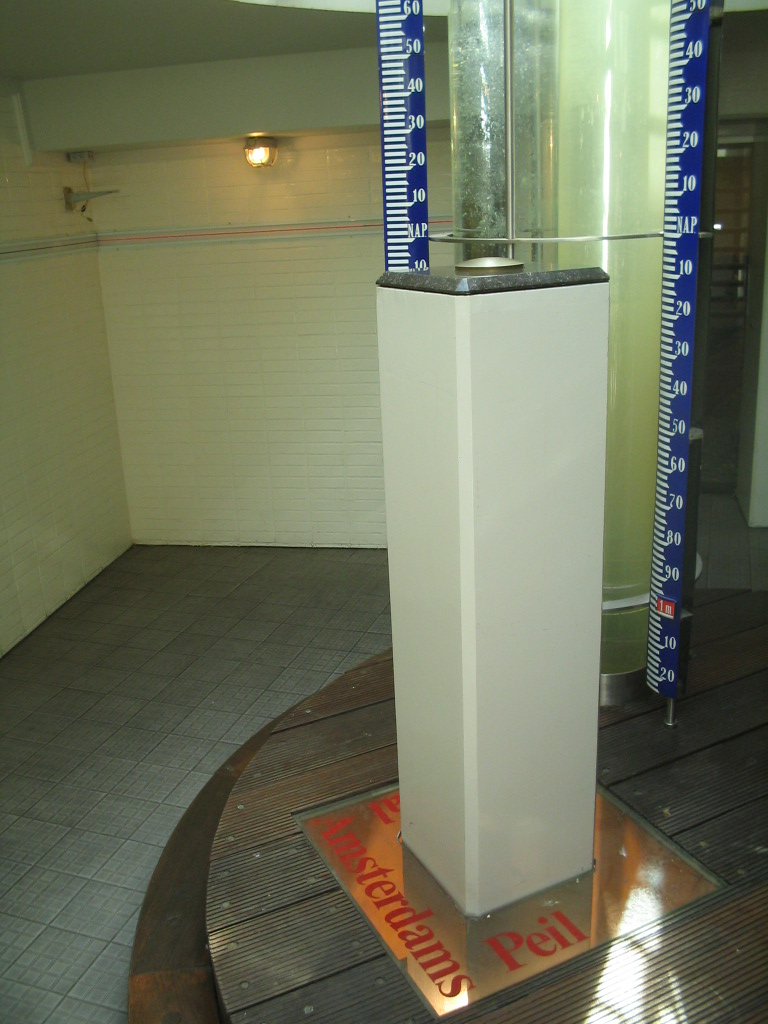
NAP level in Amsterdam City Hall

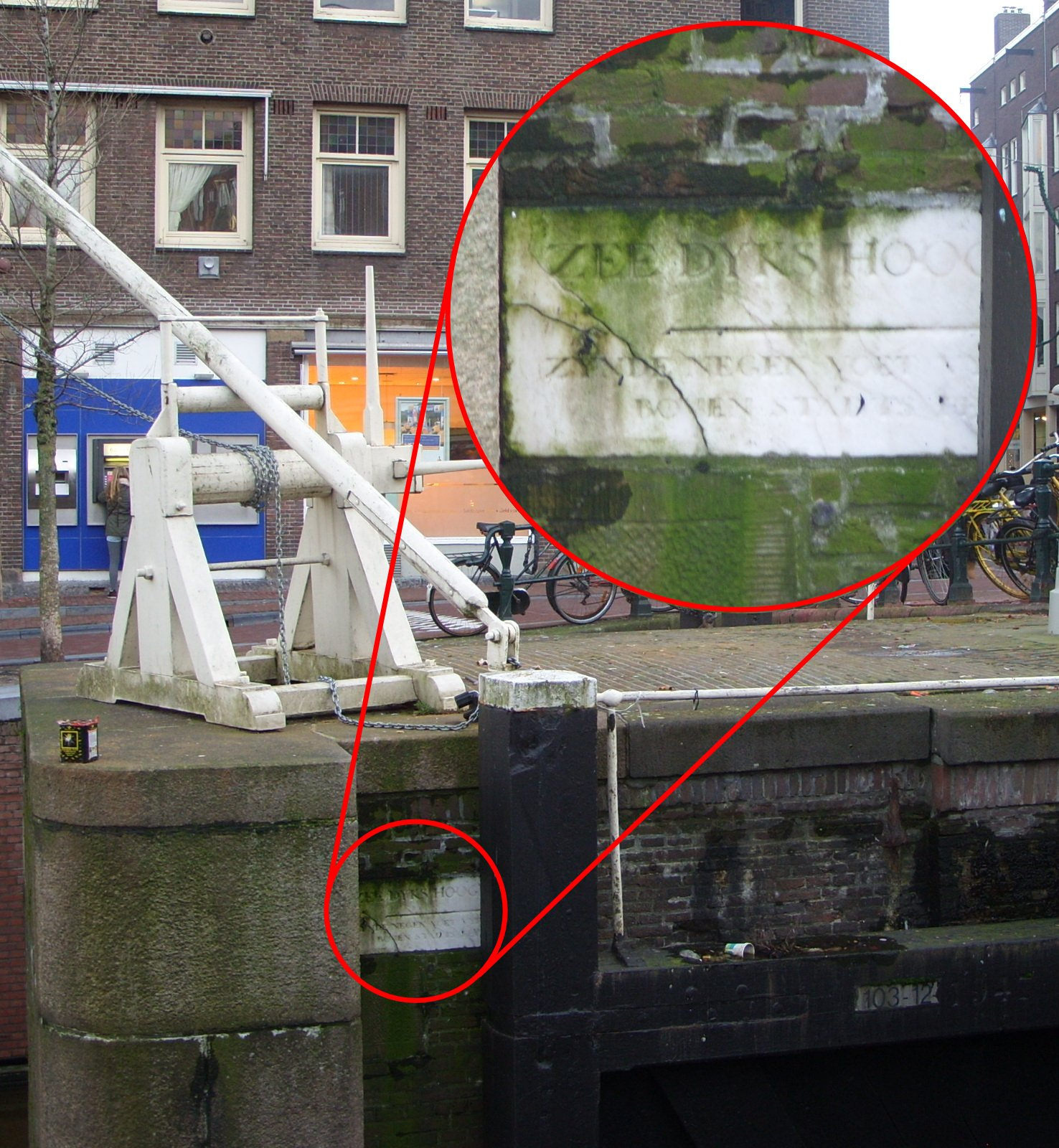
The last remaining in situ Hudde benchmark in the Eenhoorn lock in Amsterdam

Amsterdam Ordnance Datum or Normaal Amsterdams Peil (NAP) is a vertical datum in use in large parts of Western Europe. Originally created for use in the Netherlands, its height was used by Prussia in 1879 for defining Normalnull, and in 1955 by other European countries. In the 1990s, it was used as the reference level for the United European Leveling Network (UELN) which in turn led to the European Vertical Reference System (EVRS).

Mayor Johannes Hudde of Amsterdam is credited with beginning the first works for the creation of this vertical datum after he expanded the sea dike following a flood in Amsterdam in 1675. Between 1683 and 1684, he had daily measurements taken of the water level of the adjacent sea arm, Het IJ, during high tide. The calculated average was called the Amsterdams Peil ("Amsterdam level", AP) and used to calculate the minimum height of the sea dykes, which he set at "9 feet and 5 inches" (2.67 m) above AP.

In 1850, the datum was used at several places in Belgium, and in 1874 the German government adopted the datum for first-order levelling. AP was carried over to other areas in the Netherlands in 1860, to replace locally used levels. In this operation, an error was introduced which was corrected (normalised) between 1885 and 1894, resulting in the Normaal Amsterdams Peil.

Currently it is physically realised by a brass benchmark on a 22-metre (72 ft) pile below the Dam square in Amsterdam. The brass benchmark in the Amsterdam Stopera (combined city hall and opera house), which is a tourist attraction, is no longer used as a reference point.

== See also ==
- Above mean sea level
- Normalnull – German height reference system derived from Amsterdam Ordnance Datum
- Normalhöhennull – Current German height reference system linked to NAP
