= Normalnull =

Outdated official vertical datum used in Germany

Coordinates: 52.5034°N 13.3930°E

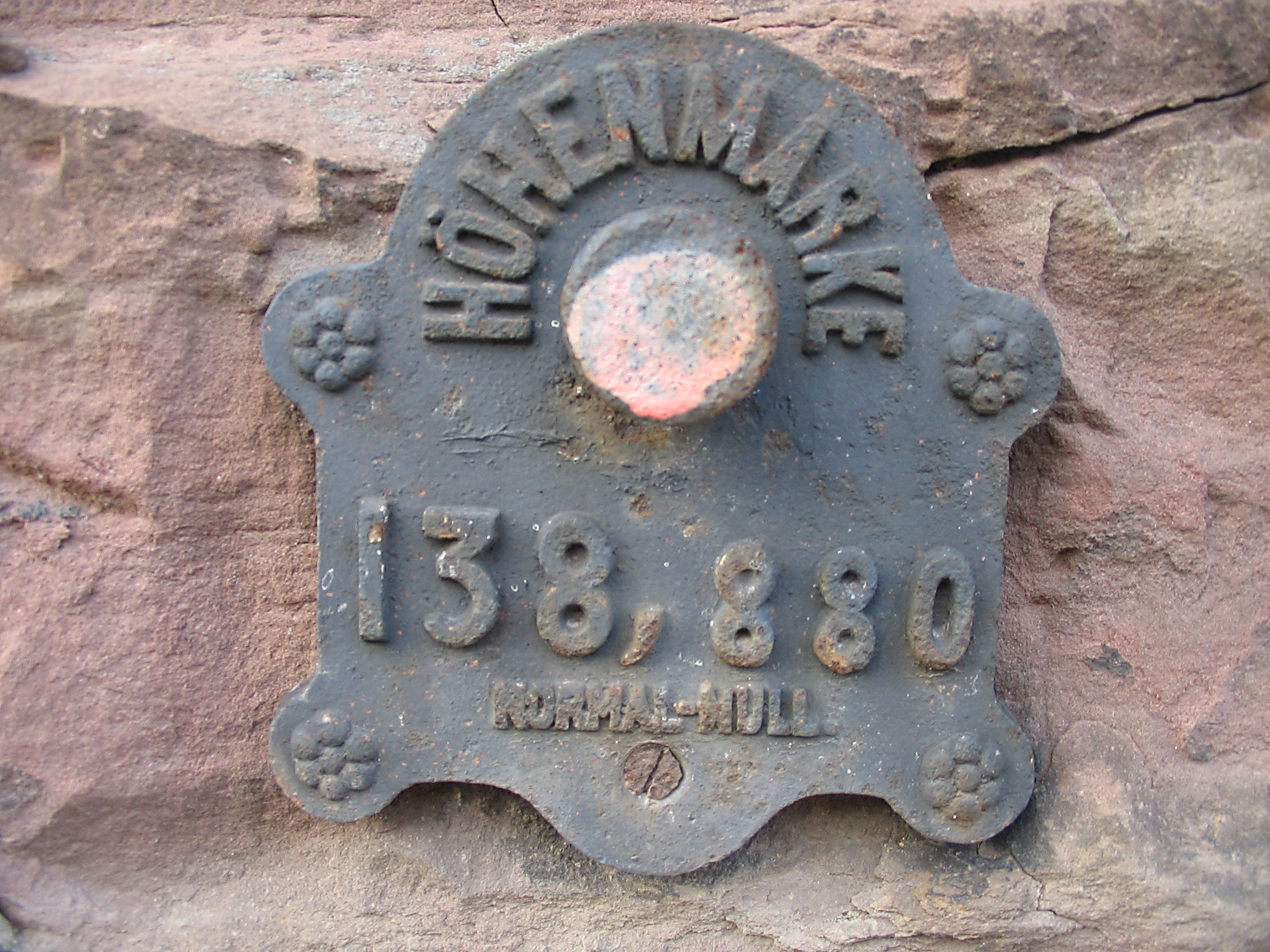
Sign referring to Normal-Null

Normalnull ("standard zero") or Normal-Null (short N. N. or NN) is an outdated official vertical datum used in Germany. Elevations using this reference system were to be marked Meter über Normal-Null ("meters above standard zero"). Normalnull has been replaced by Normalhöhennull (NHN).

== History ==
In 1878 reference heights were taken from the Amsterdam Ordnance Datum and transferred to the New Berlin Observatory in order to define the Normalhöhenpunkt 1879. Normalnull has been defined as a level going through an imaginary point 37.000 m below Normalhöhenpunkt 1879. When the New Berlin Observatory was demolished in 1912 the reference point was moved east to the village of Hoppegarten (now part of the town of Müncheberg, Brandenburg, Germany).
