= Dynamic height =

Dynamic height (symbol $H^\text{d}$ or $H^\text{dyn}$) is a way of specifying the vertical position of a point above a vertical datum; it is an alternative for orthometric height or normal height. It can be computed (in SI units of metre) by dividing the location's geopotential number (symbol C, in square metre per square second) by the normal gravity (symbol g_{c}, in metres per square second) at 45 degree latitude and zero height, a constant value (9.806199203 m/s^{2}):

$$H^\text{d}=C/g_c$$

Dynamic heights are usually chosen so that zero corresponds to the geoid.

As dynamic height is proportional to the geopotential, it remains constant over a given equigeopotential surface. Therefore, dynamic height is the most appropriate height measure when working with the level of water (as in hydrology or oceanography) over a large geographic area. For example, it is used by the International Great Lakes Datum, across the US and Canada.

However, because of variations in Earth's gravity, two surfaces having a constant difference in dynamic height or in geopotential do not have a constant geometric distance; for example, they are closer and further apart at the poles and at the equator, respectively. When differential leveling is done, the path corresponds closely to following a value of dynamic height horizontally, but not to orthometric height for vertical changes measured on the leveling rod. Thus small corrections must be applied to field measurements to obtain either the dynamic height or the orthometric height usually used in engineering. US National Geodetic Survey data sheets give both dynamic and orthometric values.

== See also ==
- Geopotential height, a similar quantity used in meteorology, based on a slightly different gravity value
