= Reference datum height =

In aviation, reference datum height (RDH) is the height of a point, located above the intersection of the runway centre line and the threshold, through which the downward extended straight portion of the glide path passes. It is usually found on the aerodrome instrument approach charts.

== See also ==
- Vertical datum
- ICAO recommendations on use of the International System of Units
