= North American Datum =

Reference frame for geodesy on the continent

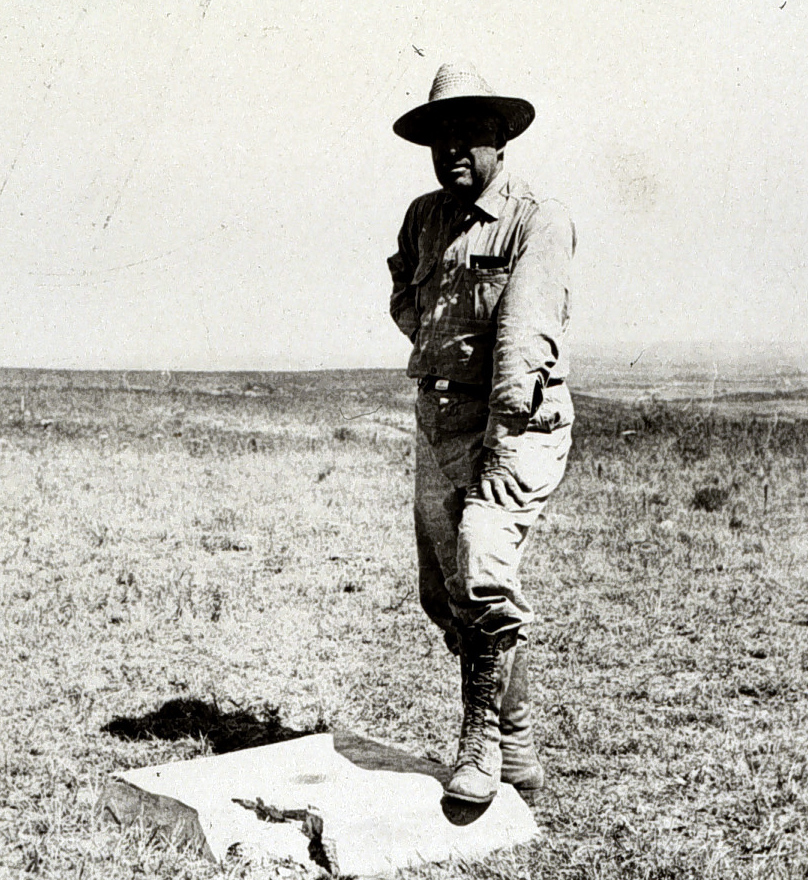
The Meades Ranch Triangulation Station, the fundamental station for the North American Datum of 1927

The North American Datum (NAD) is the horizontal datum used to define latitude and longitude (horizontal coordinates) in North America. A datum is a formal description of the shape of the Earth along with survey markers serving as "anchor" points for the coordinate system. In surveying, cartography, and land-use planning, two North American Datums are in use: the North American Datum of 1927 (NAD 27) and the North American Datum of 1983 (NAD 83). Both are geodetic reference systems based on slightly different assumptions and measurements.

Vertical measurements, based on distances above or below Mean High Water (MHW), are calculated using the North American Vertical Datum of 1988 (NAVD 88).

NAD 83, along with NAVD 88, is scheduled to be replaced in 2026 with the Datum of 2022, a new geometric reference frame and geopotential datum based on GPS and gravimetric geoid model.

== First North American Datum of 1901 ==
In 1901 the United States Coast and Geodetic Survey adopted a national horizontal datum called the United States Standard Datum, based on the Clarke Ellipsoid of 1866. It was fitted to data previously collected for regional datums, which by that time had begun to overlap. In 1913, Canada and Mexico adopted that datum, so it was also renamed the North American Datum.

== North American Datum of 1927 ==
As more data were gathered, discrepancies appeared, so the datum was recomputed in 1927, using the same spheroid and origin as its predecessor.

The North American Datum of 1927 (NAD 27) was based on surveys of the entire continent from a common reference point that was chosen in 1901, because it was as near the center of the contiguous United States as could be calculated: It was based on a triangulation station at the junction of the transcontinental triangulation arc of 1899 on the 39th parallel north and the triangulation arc along the 98th meridian west that was near the geographic center of the contiguous United States.

The datum declares the Meades Ranch Triangulation Station in Osborne County, Kansas to be 39°13′26.686″ north latitude, 98°32′30.506″ west longitude. NAD 27 is oriented by declaring the azimuth from Meades Ranch to Waldo Station (also in Osborne County, about 4.5 mi (7.2 km) northwest of Waldo, Russell County) to be 255°28′14.52″ from north. The latitude and longitude of every other point in North America is then based on its distance and direction from Meades Ranch: If a point was X meters in azimuth Y degrees from Meades Ranch, measured on the Clarke Ellipsoid of 1866, then its latitude and longitude on that ellipsoid were defined and could be calculated.

Ellipsoid	Semimajor axis (by definition)	Semiminor axis (by definition)	Inverse flattening (calculated)
Clarke 1866	6,378,206.4 m	6,356,583.8 m	294.978698214

These are the defining dimensions for NAD 27, but Clarke actually defined his 1866 spheroid as a = 20,926,062 British feet, b = 20,855,121 British feet. The conversion to meters uses Clarke's 1865 inch-meter ratio of 39.370432. The length of a foot or meter at the time could not practically be benchmarked to better than about 0.02 mm.

Most USGS topographic maps were published in NAD 27 and many major projects by the United States Army Corps of Engineers and other agencies were defined in NAD 27, so the datum remains important, despite more refined datums being available.

== North American Datum of 1983 ==
Because Earth deviates significantly from a perfect ellipsoid, the ellipsoid that best approximates its shape varies region by region across the world. Clarke 1866, and North American Datum of 1927 with it, were surveyed to best suit North America as a whole. Likewise, historically, most regions of the world used ellipsoids measured locally to best suit the vagaries of Earth's shape in their respective locales. While ensuring the most accuracy locally, this practice makes integrating and disseminating information across regions troublesome.

As satellite geodesy and remote sensing technology reached high precision and were made available for civilian applications, it became feasible to acquire information referred to a single global ellipsoid. This is because satellites naturally deal with Earth as a monolithic body. Therefore, the GRS 80 ellipsoid was developed for best approximating the Earth as a whole, and it became the foundation for the North American Datum of 1983. Though GRS 80 and its close relative, WGS 84, are generally not the best fit for any given region, a need for the closest fit largely evaporates when a global survey is combined with computers, databases, and software able to compensate for local conditions.

Ellipsoid	Semimajor axis (by definition)	Semiminor axis (by definition)	Inverse flattening (calculated)
GRS 80	6,378,137 m	6,356,752.3141 m	298.257222101

=== Comparing NAD 27 to NAD 83 ===
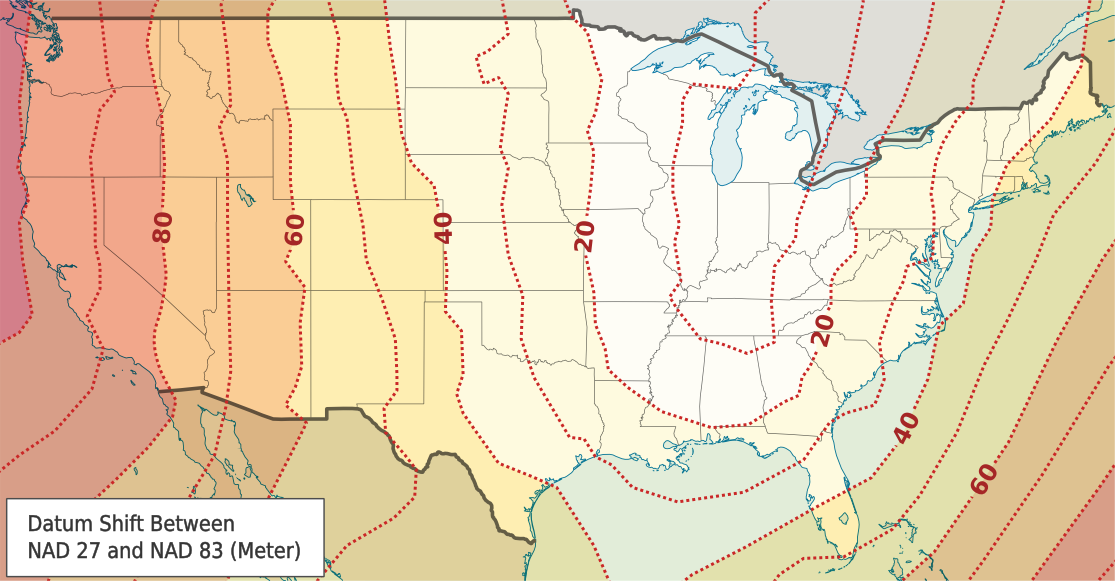
Datum Shift Between NAD 27 and NAD 83

A point having a given latitude and longitude in NAD 27 may be displaced on the order of many tens of meters from another point having the identical latitude and longitude in NAD 83, so it is important to specify the datum along with the coordinates. The North American Datum of 1927 is defined by the latitude and longitude of an initial point (Meades Ranch Triangulation Station in Kansas), the direction of a line between this point and a specified second point, and two dimensions that define the spheroid. The North American Datum of 1983 is based on a newer defined spheroid (GRS 80); it is an Earth-centered (or "geocentric") datum having no initial point or initial direction.

NOAA provides a converter between the two systems. Some examples of discrepancies between the two datums are that if you use a modern GPS device set to work in NAD 83 or WGS 84 to navigate to NAD 27 coordinates (as from a topo map) near Seattle, you would be off by about 95 meters (not far enough west). You would be about 47 meters off near Miami (not far enough north-northeast), whereas you would be much closer for points near Chicago.

=== Comparing NAD 83 to WGS 84 ===
The definition of NAD 83(1986) is based on the GRS 80 spheroid, as was WGS 84, so many older publications indicate no difference. WGS 84 subsequently changed to a slightly less flattened spheroid. This change in flattening is about 0.1 mm, a difference so small that computational programs often do not distinguish between the two ellipsoids. However, due to differences in how the reference ellipsoids are centered and oriented, coordinates in the two datums differ from each other by amounts on the order of a meter over much of the United States. Each datum has undergone refinements with more accurate and later measurements. One well-known difference is the placement of the center of the Earth, with the two systems differing by about 2.2 metres (7.2 ft).

In addition, NAD 83 is defined to remain constant over time for points on the North American Plate, whereas WGS 84 is defined with respect to the average of stations all over the world. Thus the two systems naturally diverge over time. For much of the United States the relative rate is on the order of 1 to 2 cm per year. Hawaii and the coastal portions of central and southern California west of the San Andreas Fault are not on the North American Plate, so their divergence rate differs.

=== Current implementation of NAD 83 ===
The United States National Spatial Reference System NAD 83(2011/MA11/PA11) epoch 2010.00, is a refinement of the NAD 83 datum using data from a network of very accurate GPS receivers at Continuously Operating Reference Stations (CORS). The NAD 83(2011) describes the main North American Plate, while the MA11 and PA11 solutions are for the Mariana Plate and the Pacific Plate respectively.

== New Datum of 2022 ==
To improve the National Spatial Reference System, NAD 83, along with North American Vertical Datum of 1988 (NAVD 88), are set to be replaced with a new geometric reference frame and geopotential datum based on global navigation satellite systems (GNSS), such as the Global Positioning System (GPS), and new gravimetric geoid model, potentially in 2025 or 2026. The new gravimetric geoid model is the product of the Gravity for the Redefinition of the American Vertical Datum (GRAV-D) project.

These new reference frames are intended to be easier to access and to maintain than NAD 83 and NAVD 88, which rely on physical survey marks that deteriorate over time.

== See also ==
- North American Vertical Datum of 1988
- World Geodetic System
