= Orthometric height =

Altitude above geoid or mean sea level

The orthometric height (symbol H) is the vertical distance along the plumb line from a point of interest to a reference surface known as the geoid, the vertical datum that approximates mean sea level. Orthometric height is one of the scientific formalizations of a layman's "height above sea level", along with other types of heights in Geodesy.

In the US, the current NAVD88 datum is tied to a defined elevation at one point rather than to any location's exact mean sea level. Orthometric heights are usually used in the US for engineering work, although dynamic height may be chosen for large-scale hydrological purposes. Heights for measured points are shown on National Geodetic Survey data sheets, data that was gathered over many decades by precise spirit leveling over thousands of miles.

Alternatives to orthometric height include dynamic height and normal height, and various countries may choose to operate with those definitions instead of orthometric. They may also adopt slightly different but similar definitions for their reference surface.

Since gravity is not constant over large areas the orthometric height of a level surface (equipotential) other than the reference surface is not constant, and orthometric heights need to be corrected for that effect. For example, gravity is 0.1% stronger in the northern United States than in the southern, so a level surface that has an orthometric height of 1000 meters in one place will be 1001 meters high in other places. In fact, dynamic height is the most appropriate height measure when working with the level of water over a large geographic area.

Orthometric heights may be obtained from differential leveling height differences by correcting for gravity variations. Practical applications must use a model rather than measurements to calculate the change in gravitational potential versus depth in the earth, since the geoid is below most of the land surface (e.g., the Helmert orthometric heights of NAVD88).

GPS measurements give earth-centered coordinates, usually displayed as ellipsoidal height h above the reference ellipsoid. It can be related to orthometric height H above the geoid by subtraction of the geoid height N:

$$H=h-N$$

The geoid determination requires accurate gravity data for that location; in the US, the NGS has undertaken the GRAV-D ten-year program to obtain such data with a goal of releasing a new geoid model as part of the Datum of 2022.

== See also ==
- Physical geodesy
