= Height above ground level =

Height measured with respect to the underlying ground surface

In aviation, atmospheric sciences and broadcasting, a height above ground level (AGL or HAGL) is a height measured with respect to the underlying ground surface. This is as opposed to height above mean sea level (AMSL or HAMSL), height above ellipsoid (HAE, as reported by a GPS receiver), or height above average terrain (AAT or HAAT, in broadcast engineering). In other words, these expressions (AGL, AMSL, HAE, AAT) indicate where the "zero level" or "reference altitude" – the vertical datum – is located.

Abbreviation	Stands for	Main usage	Zero level	Measuring devices
AGL, HAGL	height above ground level	aviation, atmospheric science, broadcasting	ground surface	radar altimeter
AMSL, HAMSL	height above mean sea level	nautic, technics, geography	sea level average	barometric altimeter
HAE	height above ellipsoid	navigation, science	math surface model WGS84	GPS receiver
AAT, HAAT	height above average terrain	broadcasting, cellular networks	average surrounding surface	

== Aviation ==
A pilot flying an aircraft under instrument flight rules (typically under poor visibility conditions) must rely on the aircraft's altimeter to decide when to deploy the undercarriage and prepare for landing. Therefore, the pilot needs reliable information on the height of the plane with respect to the landing area (usually an airport). The altimeter, which is usually a barometer calibrated in units of distance instead of atmospheric pressure, can therefore be set in such a way as to indicate the height of the aircraft above ground. This is done by communicating with the control tower of the airport (to get the current surface pressure) and setting the altimeter so as to read zero on the ground of that airport. Confusion between AGL and AMSL, or improper calibration of the altimeter, may result in controlled flight into terrain, a crash of a fully functioning aircraft under pilot control.

While the use of a barometric altimeter setting that provides a zero reading on the ground of the airport is a reference available to pilots, in commercial aviation it is a country-specific procedure that is not often used (it is used, e.g., in Russia, and a few other countries). Most countries (Far East, North and South America, all of Europe, Africa, Australia) use the airport's AMSL (above mean sea level) elevation as a reference. During approaches to landing, there are several other references that are used, including AFE (above field elevation) which is height referencing the highest point on the airfield, TDZE (touchdown zone elevation) or TH (threshold height) which both refer to the elevation of the landing end of the runway measured AMSL and AGL respectively.

In general, "altitude" refers to distance above mean sea level (MSL or AMSL), "height" refers to distance above a particular point (e.g. the airport, runway threshold, or ground at present location), and "elevation" describes a feature of the terrain itself in terms of distance above MSL.

== Atmospheric sciences ==
In weather and climate studies, measurements or simulations often need to refer to a specific height or altitude, which is naturally AGL. However, the values of geophysical variables measured in various places on the natural (ground) surface may not be easily compared in hilly or mountainous terrain, because part of the observed variability is due to changes in the altitude of the surface. For this reason, variables such as pressure or temperature are sometimes 'reduced' to mean sea level.

In general circulation models and global climate models, the state and properties of the atmosphere are specified or computed at a number of discrete locations and heights. When the topography of the continents is explicitly represented, the altitudes of these locations are set above the simulated ground level. This is often implemented using the so-called sigma coordinate system, which is the ratio of the pressure at a location (latitude, longitude, altitude) divided by the pressure at the nadir of that location on ground surface (same latitude, same longitude, altitude AGL = 0).

== Broadcasting ==
In broadcasting, altitude AGL has relatively little direct bearing on the broadcast range of a station. Rather, it is HAAT (the height above the average terrain (in the surrounding area)) which is used to determine how far a broadcast station (or any other sort of VHF or higher radio-frequency) transmission will travel.

From aviation safety perspective though, the more important aspect is the height of the radio tower used to support the radio antenna. In this case, height AGL is the only important measurement for aviation authorities, which require that some tall towers have proper aircraft warning paint and lights to avoid collisions.

== See also ==
- List of aviation, avionics, aerospace and aeronautical abbreviations
- Index of aviation articles
- Minimum safe altitude
