= Elevation =

Height of a geographic location above a fixed reference point

Vertical distance comparison

The elevation of a geographic location is its height above or below a fixed reference point, most commonly a reference geoid, a mathematical model of the Earth's sea level as an equipotential gravitational surface (see Geodetic datum § Vertical datum). The term elevation is mainly used when referring to points on the Earth's surface, while altitude or geopotential height is used for points above the surface, such as an aircraft in flight or a spacecraft in orbit, and depth is used for points below the surface.

Elevation histogram of the Earth's surface

Elevation is distinct from distance from the center of the Earth. Due to the equatorial bulge, the summits of Mount Everest and Chimborazo have, respectively, the largest elevation and the largest geocentric distance.

== Aviation ==
In aviation, the term elevation or aerodrome elevation is defined by the ICAO as the highest point of the landing area. It is often measured in feet and can be found in approach charts of the aerodrome. It is not to be confused with terms such as the altitude or height.

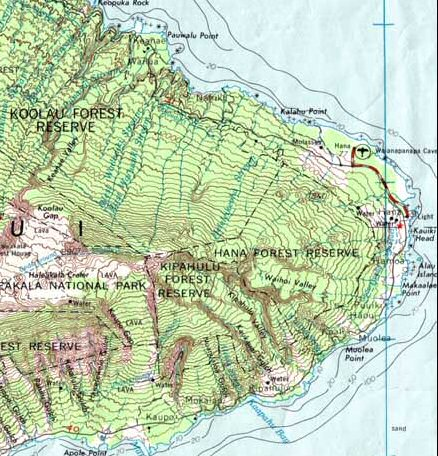
Part of a topographic map of Haleakala (Hawaii), showing elevation.

== Maps and GIS ==
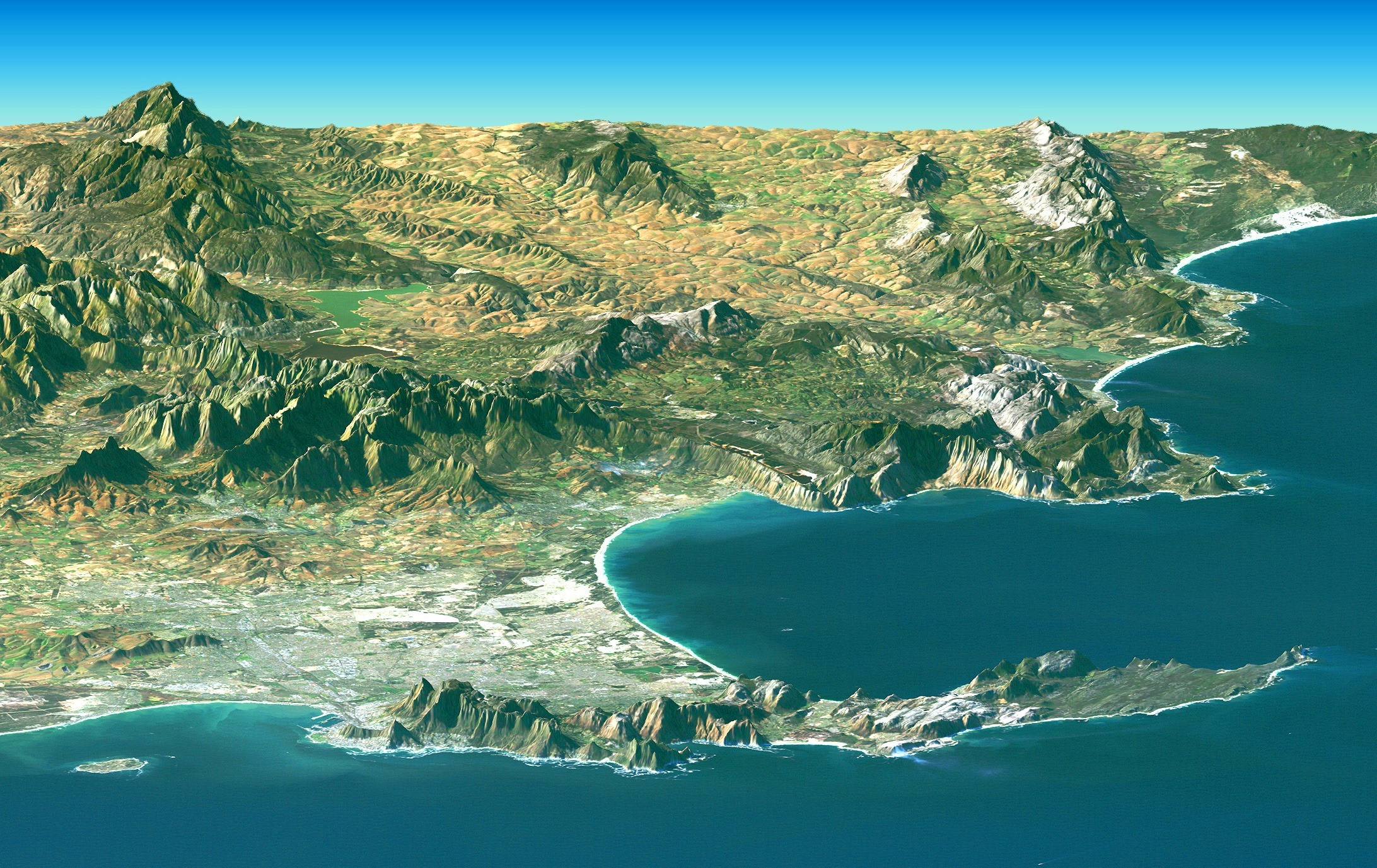
Landsat Image over SRTM Elevation by NASA, showing the Cape Peninsula and Cape of Good Hope, South Africa in the foreground.

A GIS or geographic information system is a computer system that allows for the visualization, manipulation, capture, and storage of data with associated attributes. GIS offers better understanding of patterns and relationships of the landscape at different scales. Tools inside the GIS allow for manipulation of data for spatial analysis or cartography.

Heightmap of Earth's surface (including water and ice) in equirectangular projection, normalized as 8-bit grayscale, where lighter values indicate higher elevation.

A topographical map is the main type of map used to depict elevation, often through contour lines. In a Geographic Information System (GIS), digital elevation models (DEM) are commonly used to represent the surface (topography) of a place, through a raster (grid) dataset of elevations. Digital terrain models are another way to represent terrain in GIS.

USGS (United States Geologic Survey) is developing a 3D Elevation Program (3DEP) to keep up with growing needs for high quality topographic data. 3DEP is a collection of enhanced elevation data in the form of high quality LiDAR data over the conterminous United States, Hawaii, and the U.S. territories. There are three bare earth DEM layers in 3DEP which are nationally seamless at the resolution of 1/3, 1, and 2 arcseconds.

== See also ==
- Amsterdam Ordnance Datum, a.k.a. Normaal Amsterdams Peil (NAP), Dutch vertical datum
- Elevation profile
- Geodesy
- GTOPO30 a digital elevation model for the world
- Hypsometric tints
- Lapse rate, or the adiabatic lapse rate
- List of highest mountains on Earth
- List of the highest major summits of North America
- Normalhöhennull, German vertical datum, literally: standard elevation zero, (NHN)
- North American Vertical Datum of 1988, (NAVD 88)
  - Sea Level Datum of 1929, a superseded United States vertical datum, (NGVD 29)
- Orthometric height
- Topographic isolation
- Topographic prominence
- Vertical pressure variation
