= Normalhöhennull =

Vertical datum used in Germany

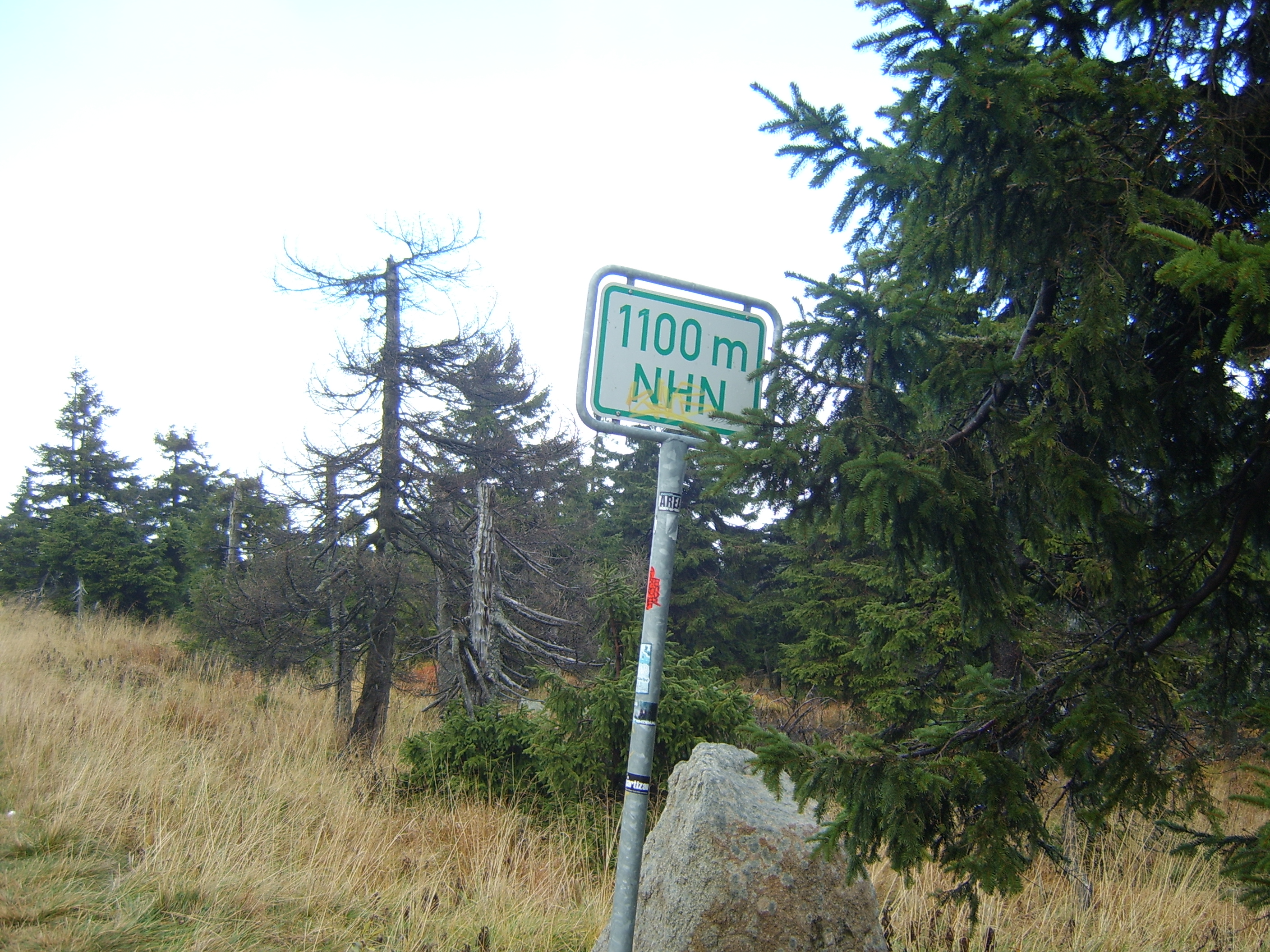
NHN height sign in the Harz mountains of Germany on the Brocken road

Normalhöhennull (German pronunciation: [nɔʁmaːlˈhøːənˌnʊl], "standard elevation zero") or NHN is a vertical datum used in Germany.

In geographical terms, NHN is the reference plane for the normal height of a topographical eminence height above mean sea level used in the 1932 German Mean Height Reference System (Deutsches Haupthöhennetz). The plane is in the shape of a quasi-geoid. The reference height is a geodetic, fixed point on the New Church of St. Alexander at Wallenhorst in the German state of Lower Saxony. The geopotential height of this point was calculated in 1986 as part of the United European Levelling Network (UELN), based on the Amsterdam Ordnance Datum.

== Definition ==
The curved blue line is the quasi-geoid Normalhöhennull reference plane. Key: Erdoberfläche - earth's surface Normalhöhe = normal height ellipsoidische Höhe - ellipsoidal height Quasigeoidhöhe - quasi-geoid height.

The NHN plane is a theoretical reference plane. It is derived by deducting normal heights from the normal plumb line. The difference between the resulting quasi-geoid and the reference ellipsoid is called the height anomaly or quasi-geoid height.

== Change-over from NN to NHN ==
Since 1 January 2000 the whole of Germany has changed its height system over to normal heights based on the datum of the Amsterdam Ordnance Datum, known as the German Mean Height Reference System, DHHN92. At the same time, the new NHN is the basis of the United European Levelling Net (UELN), formerly known as the Reseau Européen Unifié de Nivellement or REUN, which standardises the height systems of the European countries. Heights in this system are given in meters above NHN or m (NHN).

The NHN was introduced because for heights above Normalnull the actual gravitational field of the Earth was not taken into account. As a result, there were changes in both the old West German normal orthometric heights (new methods of calculation) and the normal heights of East Germany (with respect to the Amsterdam Datum). The elevations differed — depending on location — by 0.06 to 0.16 m. As a result of new measurements as part of the changeover, however, variations of 0.59 m (Zugspitze) have surfaced.

Older relief maps often show heights above the old reference planes. Current maps by the federal survey authorities are based on NHN. At the beginning of 2013 most of the federal states (except Berlin, Thuringia and Saxony-Anhalt) had complete coverage by the new digital topographic mapping at 1:25,000 scale (DTK). Not all the maps have appeared in print yet. On the DTK25 maps, NHN is used for elevations; however, on the DTK25-V scanned topographic maps Höhennull (HN) and Normalnull (NN) are still being used.

== Old East German height system ==
In East Germany normal heights used to be referred to as heights above Höhennormal or HN. The 1958 Kronstadt Tide Gauge (Kronstädter Pegel) was used as the datum. The new NHN heights are typically 12–15 cm higher. The maximum deviations in the spirit level points of first order are between 7 and 16 cm.
