= GQS =

GQS may refer to:

- Geoid–quasigeoid separation, measurement used in normal height
- General Quarters Software, video game developer of Banzai: Death Sortie of the Yamato
