= Physical geodesy =

Study of the physical properties of the Earth's gravity field

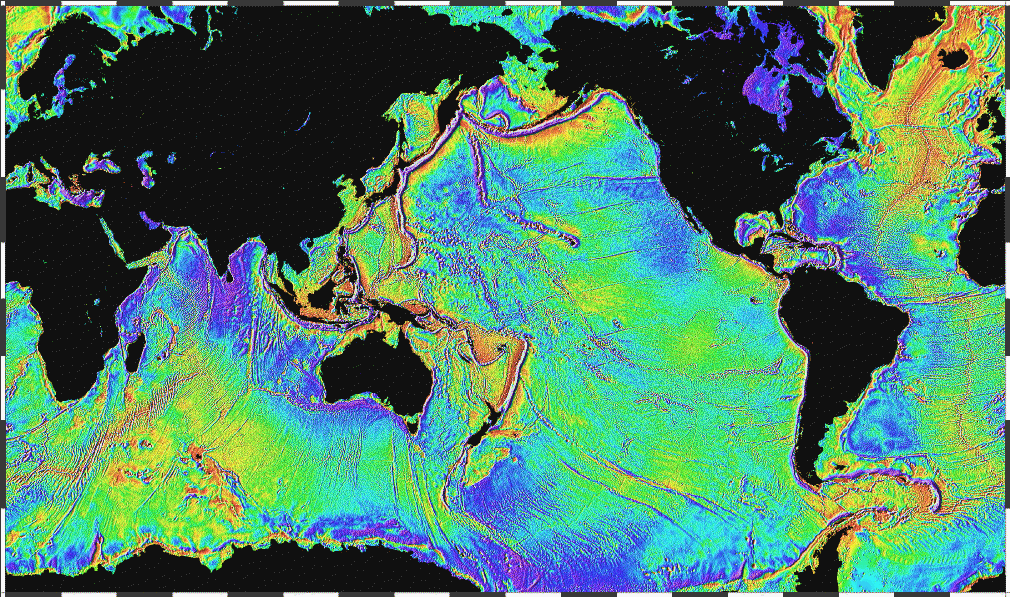
Ocean basins mapped gravitationally. Seafloor features larger than 10 km are detected by resulting gravitational distortion of sea surface. (1995, NOAA)

Physical geodesy is the study of the physical properties of Earth's gravity and its potential field (the geopotential), with a view to their application in geodesy.

== Measurement procedure ==
Traditional geodetic instruments such as theodolites rely on the gravity field for orienting their vertical axis along the local plumb line or local vertical direction with the aid of a spirit level. After that, vertical angles (zenith angles or, alternatively, elevation angles) are obtained with respect to this local vertical, and horizontal angles in the plane of the local horizon, perpendicular to the vertical.

Levelling instruments again are used to obtain geopotential differences between points on the Earth's surface. These can then be expressed as "height" differences by conversion to metric units.

=== Units ===
Gravity is commonly measured in units of m·s^{−2} (metres per second squared). This also can be expressed (multiplying by the gravitational constant G in order to change units) as newtons per kilogram of attracted mass.

Potential is expressed as gravity times distance, m^{2}·s^{−2}. Travelling one metre in the direction of a gravity vector of strength 1 m·s^{−2} will increase your potential by 1 m^{2}·s^{−2}. Again employing G as a multiplier, the units can be changed to joules per kilogram of attracted mass.

A more convenient unit is the GPU, or geopotential unit: it equals 10 m^{2}·s^{−2}. This means that travelling one metre in the vertical direction, i.e., the direction of the 9.8 m·s^{−2} ambient gravity, will approximately change your potential by 1 GPU. Which again means that the difference in geopotential, in GPU, of a point with that of sea level can be used as a rough measure of height "above sea level" in metres.

== Gravity ==
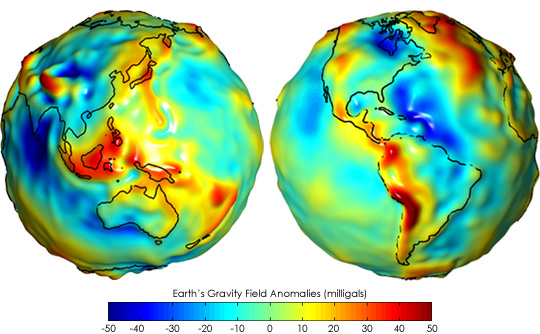
Earth's gravity measured by NASA GRACE mission, showing deviations from the theoretical gravity of an idealized, smooth Earth ellipsoid. The deviations toward stronger gravity are colored red; deviations toward weaker gravity are colored blue.

The gravity of Earth, denoted by g, is the net acceleration that is imparted to objects due to the combined effect of gravitation (from mass distribution within Earth) and the centrifugal force (from the Earth's rotation). It is a vector quantity, whose direction coincides with a plumb bob and strength or magnitude is given by the norm $g=\|\mathit{\mathbf{g}}\|$.

In SI units, this acceleration is expressed in metres per second squared (in symbols, m/s^{2} or m·s^{−2}) or equivalently in newtons per kilogram (N/kg or N·kg^{−1}). Near Earth's surface, the acceleration due to gravity, accurate to 2 significant figures, is 9.8 m/s^{2} (32 ft/s^{2}). This means that, ignoring the effects of air resistance, the vertical component of velocity of an object falling freely will increase in the downwards direction by about 9.8 metres per second (32 ft/s) every second.

The precise strength of Earth's gravity varies with location. The conventional value for standard gravity is 9.80665 m⋅s^{−2} by definition, originally adopted by the CGPM in 1901. This quantity is denoted variously as g_{n}, g_{e}, g_{0}, or simply g (which is also used for the variable local value).

The weight of an object on Earth's surface is the downwards force on that object, given by Newton's second law of motion, or F = m a (force = mass × acceleration). Gravitational acceleration contributes to the total gravity acceleration, but other factors, such as the rotation of Earth, also contribute, and, therefore, affect the weight of the object. Gravity does not normally include the gravitational pull of the Moon and Sun, which are accounted for in terms of tidal effects.

== Potential fields ==
Geopotential (symbol W) is the potential of the Earth's gravity field. It has SI units of square metre per square seconds (m^{2}/s^{2}). For convenience it is often defined as the negative of the potential energy per unit mass, so that the gravity vector is obtained as the gradient of the geopotential, without the negation. In addition to the actual potential (the geopotential), a theoretical normal potential (symbol U) and their difference, the disturbing potential (T = W − U), can also be defined.

== Geoid ==
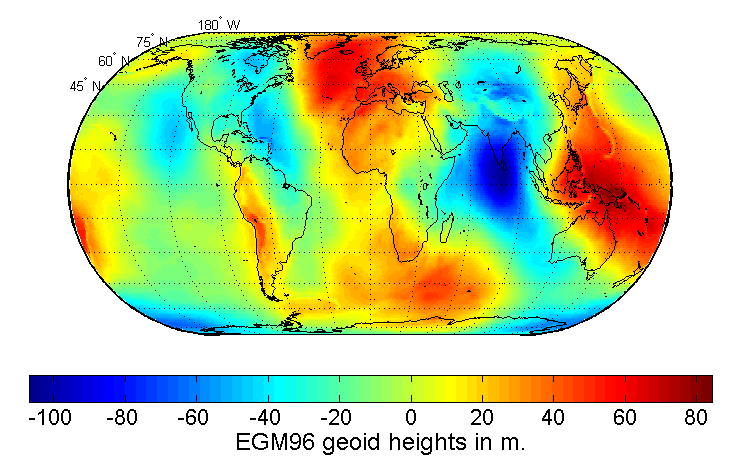
Map of the undulation of the geoid in meters (based on the EGM96)

Due to the irregularity of the Earth's true gravity field, the equilibrium figure of sea water, or the geoid, will also be of irregular form. In some places, like west of Ireland, the geoid—mathematical mean sea level—sticks out as much as 100 m above the regular, rotationally symmetric reference ellipsoid of GRS80; in other places, like close to Sri Lanka, it dives under the ellipsoid by nearly the same amount. The separation between the geoid and the reference ellipsoid is called the undulation of the geoid, symbol $N$.

The geoid, or mathematical mean sea surface, is defined not only on the seas, but also under land; it is the equilibrium water surface that would result, would sea water be allowed to move freely (e.g., through tunnels) under the land. Technically, an equipotential surface of the true geopotential, chosen to coincide (on average) with mean sea level.

As mean sea level is physically realized by tide gauge bench marks on the coasts of different countries and continents, a number of slightly incompatible "near-geoids" will result, with differences of several decimetres to over one metre between them, due to the dynamic sea surface topography. These are referred to as vertical datums or height datums.

For every point on Earth, the local direction of gravity or vertical direction, materialized with the plumb line, is perpendicular to the geoid (see astrogeodetic leveling).

== Gravity anomalies ==
Above we already made use of gravity anomalies $\Delta g$. These are computed as the differences between true (observed) gravity $g=\|\vec{g}\|$, and calculated (normal) gravity $\gamma=\|\vec{\gamma}\|=\|\nabla U\|$. (This is an oversimplification; in practice the location in space at which γ is evaluated will differ slightly from that where g has been measured.) We thus get

$$\Delta g = g - \gamma.\,$$

These anomalies are called free-air anomalies, and are the ones to be used in the above Stokes equation.

In geophysics, these anomalies are often further reduced by removing from them the attraction of the topography, which for a flat, horizontal plate (Bouguer plate) of thickness H is given by

$$a_B=2\pi G\rho H,\,$$

The Bouguer reduction to be applied as follows:

$$\Delta g_B = \Delta g_{FA} - a_B,\,$$

so-called Bouguer anomalies. Here, $\Delta g_{FA}$ is our earlier $\Delta g$, the free-air anomaly.

In case the terrain is not a flat plate (the usual case!) we use for H the local terrain height value but apply a further correction called the terrain correction.

== See also ==
- Deflection of the vertical
- Dynamic height
- Friedrich Robert Helmert
- Geophysics
- Gravity of Earth
- Gravimetry
- LAGEOS
- Mikhail Molodenskii
- Normal height
- Orthometric height
- Satellite geodesy
