= Mikhail Molodenskii =

Soviet geodesist

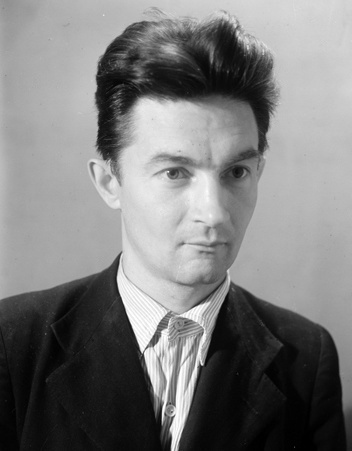
Mikhail Molodenskii

Mikhail Sergeyevich Molodenskii (Russian: Михаил Сергеевич Молоденский, sometimes transliterated as M. S. Molodensky, 16 June [O.S. 3 June] 1909, Yepifan or Tula – 12 November 1991, Moscow) was a Russian physical geodesist. He was once said to be "probably the only geodesist who would have deserved a Nobel Prize".

He graduated from Moscow State University (1936), since 1946 he worked for the Institute of Earth Physics (Институт Физики Земли АН СССР). He created an original theory for determining the figure of the Earth and its gravity field based on measurements done on the topographic surface, built the first Soviet gravimeter, developed a theory of the nutation of Earth. He won the Stalin Prize (1946 and 1951) and the Lenin Prize (1961). His legacy includes the Molodensky transformations, which are commonly used to transform between geodetic datums.

His main work (since 1932) was on the geoid and its exterior gravity field or geopotential. His aim was to develop hypothesis-free methods for determining both the gravity field and defining vertical datums for large areas. As part of this work, he introduced normal heights, which can be calculated from geopotential numbers (obtained from precise differential levelling) without needing the uncertain value of gravity along the plumb line of a point, i.e., inside the continental crustal rock under the point.

Corresponding to this new height concept is the concept of the telluroid, the collection of points Q whose normal potential is equal to the true geopotential of a point P on the terrain, and on the same plumb line. The separation between points P and Q, i.e., between topographic and telluroid surfaces, is called the height anomaly, and is, contrary to the geoid undulation N (with respect to the reference ellipsoid), defined without requiring density information throughout space, not only at sea level.

Over time, Molodenskii's theoretical work has found recognition as more and more countries are adopting normal heights for their national height systems. As a compromise to traditional thinking, the concept of quasi-geoid has been introduced, being a surface separated from the reference ellipsoid by precisely an amount equal to the height anomaly evaluated on the topography. Then, the traditional connection between orthometric heights H and ellipsoidal heights h,

$$h = H+N$$,

is preserved as

$$h = H^* + \zeta$$,

where $\zeta$ is the height anomaly (or "quasi-geoid height"), and $H^*$ is normal height.

== Works ==
- Molodensky M.S. "Basic issues of geodetic gravimetry", Proceedings of the Central Scientific-Industrial Institute of Geodesy, Aerial Photography and Cartography, 1945, issue 42. (Note: Молоденский М. С. Основные вопросы геодезической гравиметрии, «Труды Центрального н.-и. ин-та геодезии, аэросъемки и картографии», 1945, вып. 42).)
- Molodensky M. S., Fedynsky V. V. "Thirty years of Soviet gravimetry (1917-1947)", Bulletin of the Academy of Sciences of the Soviet Union, Geographical and Geophysical Series 1947. Vol. 11. No. 4. pp. 395–408. (Note: Молоденский М. С., Федынский В. В. Тридцать лет советской гравиметрии (1917—1947 гг.) // Изв. АН СССР. Геогр. геофиз. 1947. Т. 11. № 4. С. 395—408.)
- Molodensky M.S. "Method of joint processing of gravimetric and geodetic materials for studying the gravitational field of the Earth and its shape", Bulletin of the Academy of Sciences of the Soviet Union, Geographical and Geophysical Series, 1951. issue 86. (Note: Молоденский М. С. Метод совместной обработки гравиметрических и геодезических материалов для изучения гравитационного поля Земли и её фигуры, там же, 1951. вып. 86.)
- Molodensky M.S. "Elastic tides, free nutation and some questions of the structure of the Earth", Proceedings of the Geophysical Institute of the USSR Academy of Sciences, 1953, No. 19 (146). (Note: Молоденский М. С. Упругие приливы, свободная нутация и некоторые вопросы строения Земли, «Труды геофизического ин-та Акад. наук СССР», 1953, № 19 (146).)

== Awards and Honors ==
- Stalin Prize, 2nd class (1946) — for the scholarly work “Fundamental Issues of Geodetic Gravimetry” (1945)
- Stalin Prize, 3rd class (1951) — for the collective development and implementation of spring gravimeters for geophysical exploration
- Lenin Prize (1963) — for the creation of methods for determining the gravitational field, the Earth’s figure, and the theory of terrestrial tides
