= Child labor in Saudi Arabia =

Child Labor in Saudi Arabia is the employing of children for work that deprives children of their childhood, dignity, potential, and that is harmful to a child's physical and mental development.

== Definitions ==
=== Child Labor ===
Child labor, as defined by the International Labour Organization (ILO), is work that deprives children of their childhood, dignity, potential, and that is harmful to a child's physical and mental development. International efforts to abolish child labor were first organized at the International Labour Conference in Berlin in 1890. Child labor is far more prevalent in developing countries, including much of the middle east, where millions of children are working in mines, fields, and service industries. Child labor has existed throughout history and reached its peak in western society during the 19th and 20th centuries following the onset of the industrial revolution. In poor countries, one in four children are working in a form of child labor. Primary causes of child labor are poverty and lack of access to education. Oftentimes, income the child makes from their work is thought of as crucial for their survival and the survival of their family.

=== Consequences of Child Labor ===
Consequences of child labor include interfering with a child's schooling by depriving them the ability to attend school as a result of working. A child may be obliged to leave school before completion or demanding the child to attend school along with long and demanding work. According to a study conducted by ILO, sending a child into child labor rather than to school can bring large economic downfalls for developing nations. Employed children are less likely to attend school and results in a less educated, and less economically competitive population in the future.

== Current state of child labor in Saudi Arabia ==
Saudi Arabia Census 2011 shows children and young adults make up half of the 28 million population in Saudi Arabia. Of this population, 15 percent are child laborers. 42 percent of the children spend four to eight hours a day outside the home, 40 percent spend eight to 12 hours, while 10 percent spend more than 12 hours outside the home. The majority of child labor in Saudi Arabia is concentrated in the areas of human trafficking, agriculture, and family businesses. The Government of Yemen has signed trafficking agreements with neighboring countries, provided training to security and border officials on how to recognize and care for trafficked children, raised awareness among parents about the dangers of child trafficking, and established a reception and rehabilitation centre on the border with Saudi Arabia for returned child victim.

According to a 2018 Report on Saudi Arabia human rights conducted by the US Government, the law prohibits inhumane forms of child labor. It states that no person younger than 15 is permitted to work unless that person is the sole source of support for the family. If a child is between the ages of 13 and 15, they are permitted to work as long as it does not interfere with their schoolwork. Children under the age of 18 are not allowed to work shifts longer than 6 hours a day or no more than 30 hours per week. Additionally, minors are under no circumstances are to be employed in environments deemed hazardous or harmful. There is no minimum age for workers employed in family-owned businesses. These businesses and household jobs include farming, herding, and domestic service.

== Industries ==
=== Child Trafficking ===
One of the foremost forms of child labor in Saudi Arabia. Globally in 2006, it was estimated 1.2 million children were subjected to trafficking annually. Children in the Saudi Arabia region are trafficked for multiple reasons, including cheap labor, sex exploitation, and for use in local militias. Trafficking expands to war efforts as well. Human rights monitoring organization SAM reported Saudi Arabia has been enlisting Yemeni children using human trafficking to fight alongside Saudi Arabia against Yemen.

=== Agriculture ===
Has the highest percentage of all child labor, 62%. The predominant drivers for child labor in agriculture include lack of access to education and poverty. To be considered child labor, the work done in the agriculture industry must be hazardous or interfere with schooling. Most children are involved in agriculture working in their own family's farm. These households are oftentimes poorer, an indication the children will be involved in a form of child labor.
