= World Geodetic System =

Geodetic reference system

The World Geodetic System (WGS) is a standard used in cartography, geodesy, and satellite navigation, including GPS. The current version, WGS 84, defines an Earth-centered, Earth-fixed coordinate system and a geodetic datum, and also describes the associated Earth Gravitational Model (EGM) and World Magnetic Model (WMM). The standard is published and maintained by the United States National Geospatial-Intelligence Agency.

== Background ==
Efforts to supplement the various national surveying systems began in the 19th century with F.R. Helmert's book Mathematische und Physikalische Theorien der Physikalischen Geodäsie (Mathematical and Physical Theories of Physical Geodesy). Austria and Germany founded the Zentralbüro für die Internationale Erdmessung (Central Bureau of International Geodesy), and a series of global ellipsoids of the Earth were derived (e.g., Helmert 1906, Hayford 1910 and 1924).

A unified geodetic system for the whole world became essential in the 1950s for several reasons:

- International space science and the beginning of astronautics,
- The lack of inter-continental geodetic information,
- The inability of the large geodetic systems, such as European Datum (ED50), North American Datum (NAD), and Tokyo Datum (TD), to provide a worldwide geo-data basis,
- Need for global maps for navigation, aviation, and geography, and
- Western Cold War preparedness necessitated a standardised, NATO-wide geospatial reference system, in accordance with the NATO Standardisation Agreement.

== Series ==
=== WGS 60 ===
In the late 1950s, the United States Department of Defense, together with scientists of other institutions and countries, began to develop the needed world system to which geodetic data could be referred and compatibility established between the coordinates of widely-separated sites of interest. Efforts of the US Army, Navy, and Air Force were combined leading to the DoD World Geodetic System 1960 (WGS 60). The term datum as used here refers to a smooth surface somewhat arbitrarily defined as zero elevation, consistent with a set of surveyor's measures of distances between various stations, and differences in elevation, all reduced to a grid of latitudes, longitudes, and elevations. Heritage surveying methods found elevation differences from a local horizontal determined by the spirit level, plumb line, or an equivalent device that depends on the local gravity field (see physical geodesy). As a result, the elevations in the data are referenced to the geoid, a surface that is not readily found using satellite geodesy. The latter observational method is more suitable for global mapping. Therefore, a motivation, and a substantial problem in the WGS and similar work, is to patch together data that were not only made separately for different regions, but to re-reference the elevations to an ellipsoid model rather than to the geoid.

Gravimetric datum orientation. Ellipsoid of astro-geodetically oriented datum Geoid Gravimetrically-oriented ellipsoid

In accomplishing WGS 60, a combination of available surface gravity data, astro-geodetic data, and results from HIRAN and Canadian SHORAN surveys were used to define a best-fitting ellipsoid and an earth-centered orientation for each initially selected datum. (Every datum is relatively oriented with respect to different portions of the geoid by the astro-geodetic methods already described.) The sole contribution of satellite data to the development of WGS 60 was a value for the ellipsoid flattening, which was obtained from the nodal motion of a satellite.

Prior to WGS 60, the US Army and US Air Force had each developed a world system by using different approaches to the gravimetric datum orientation method. To determine their gravimetric orientation parameters, the Air Force used the mean of the differences between the gravimetric and astro-geodetic deflections and geoid heights (undulations) at specifically selected stations in the areas of the major datums. The Army performed an adjustment to minimize the difference between astro-geodetic and gravimetric geoids. By matching the relative astro-geodetic geoids of the selected datums with an earth-centered gravimetric geoid, the selected datums were reduced to an earth-centered orientation. Since the Army and Air Force systems agreed remarkably well for the NAD, ED, and TD areas, they were consolidated and became WGS 60.

=== WGS 66 ===
Improvements to the global system included the Astrogeoid of Irene Fischer and the astronautic Mercury datum. In January 1966, a World Geodetic System Committee composed of representatives from the United States Army, Navy, and Air Force was charged with developing an improved WGS, needed to satisfy mapping, charting, and geodetic requirements. Additional surface-gravity observations, results from the extension of triangulation and trilateration networks, and large amounts of Doppler and optical satellite data had become available since the development of WGS 60. Using the additional data and improved techniques, WGS 66 was produced, which served DoD needs for about five years after its implementation in 1967. The defining parameters of the WGS 66 Ellipsoid were the flattening (1/298.25 determined from satellite data) and the semimajor axis (6378145 m determined from a combination of Doppler satellite and astro-geodetic data). A worldwide 5°×5° mean-free-air gravity-anomaly field provided the basic data for producing the WGS 66 gravimetric geoid. Also, a geoid referenced to the WGS 66 Ellipsoid was derived from available astrogeodetic data to provide a detailed representation of limited land areas.

=== WGS 72 ===
After an extensive effort over a period of approximately three years, the Department of Defense World Geodetic System 1972 was completed. Selected satellite, surface-gravity, and astrogeodetic data available through 1972 from both DoD and non-DoD sources were used in a Unified WGS Solution (a large-scale least-squares adjustment). The results of the adjustment consisted of corrections to initial station coordinates and coefficients of the gravitational field.

The largest collection of data ever used for WGS purposes was assembled, processed, and applied in the development of WGS 72. Both optical and electronic satellite data were used. The electronic satellite data consisted, in part, of Doppler data provided by the US Navy and cooperating non-DoD satellite tracking stations established in support of the Navy's Navigational Satellite System (NNSS). Doppler data was also available from the numerous sites established by GEOCEIVERS during 1971 and 1972. Doppler data was the primary data source for WGS 72 (see image). Additional electronic satellite data was provided by the SECOR (Sequential Collation of Range) Equatorial Network completed by the US Army in 1970. Optical satellite data from the Worldwide Geometric Satellite Triangulation Program was provided by the BC-4 camera system (see image). Data from the Smithsonian Astrophysical Observatory was also used which included camera (Baker–Nunn) and some laser ranging.

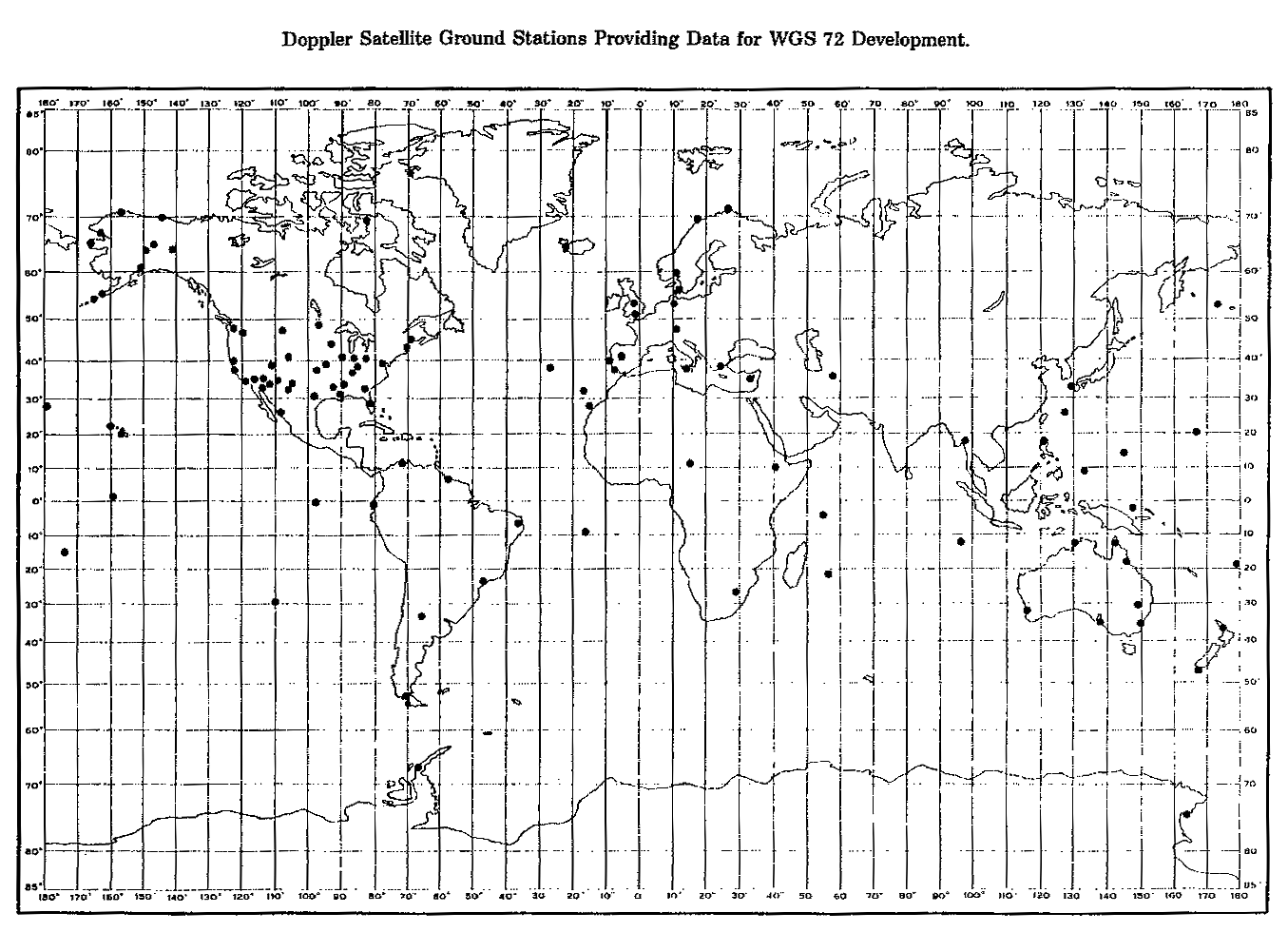
Doppler satellite ground stations providing data for WGS 72 development

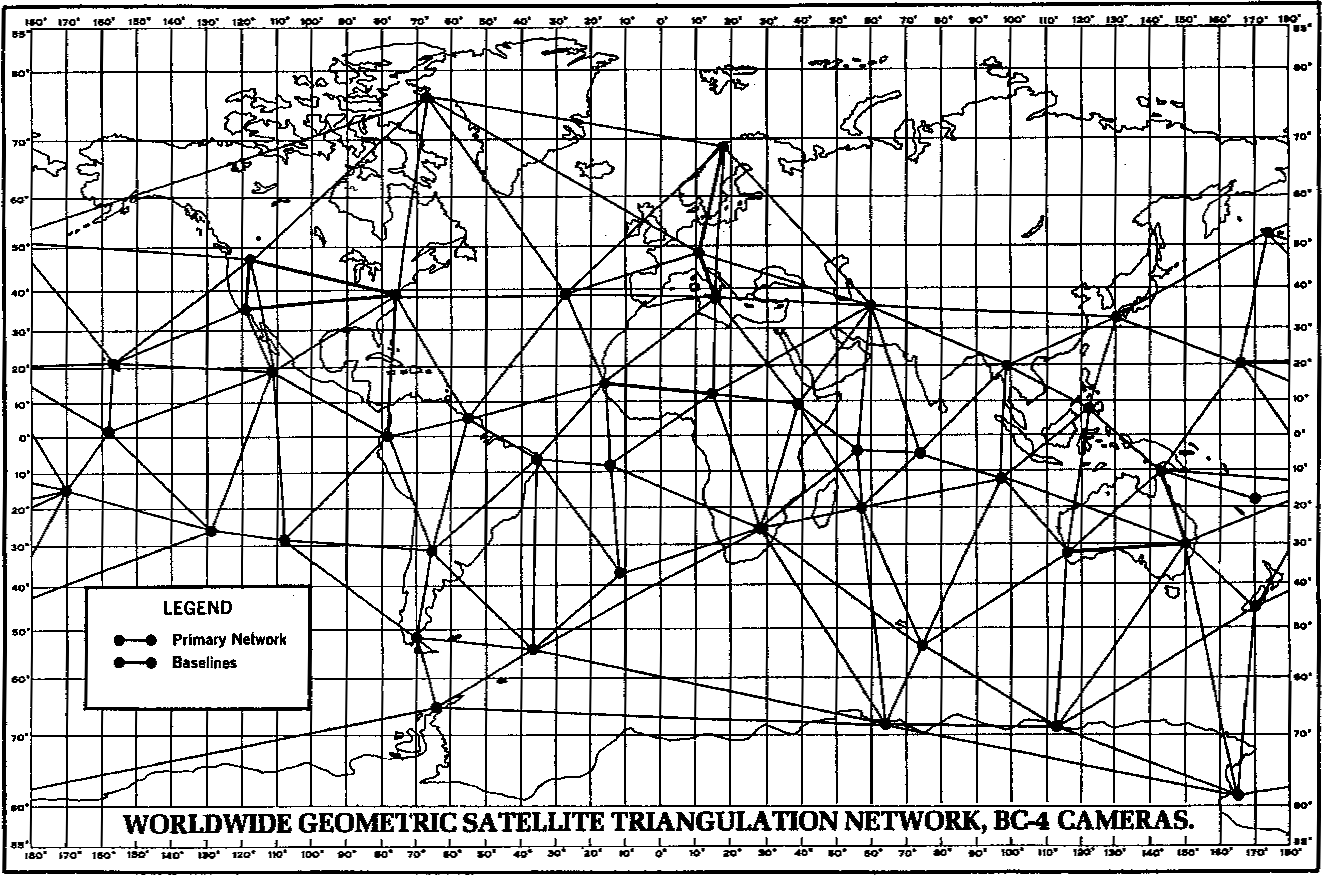
Worldwide geometric satellite triangulation network, BC-4 cameras

The surface gravity field used in the Unified WGS Solution consisted of a set of 410 10°×10° equal-area mean-free-air gravity anomalies determined solely from terrestrial data. This gravity field includes mean anomaly values compiled directly from observed gravity data wherever the latter was available in sufficient quantity. The value for areas of sparse or no observational data were developed from geophysically compatible gravity approximations using gravity-geophysical correlation techniques. Approximately 45% of the 410 mean-free-air gravity anomaly values were determined directly from observed gravity data.

The astrogeodetic data in its basic form consists of deflection of the vertical components referred to the various national geodetic datums. These deflection values were integrated into astrogeodetic geoid charts referred to these national datums. The geoid heights contributed to the Unified WGS Solution by providing additional and more detailed data for land areas. Conventional ground-survey data was included in the solution to enforce a consistent adjustment of the coordinates of neighboring observation sites of the BC-4, SECOR, Doppler, and Baker–Nunn systems. Also, eight geodimeter long-line precise traverses were included for the purpose of controlling the scale of the solution.

The Unified WGS Solution, as stated above, was a solution for geodetic positions and associated parameters of the gravitational field based on an optimum combination of available data. The WGS 72 ellipsoid parameters, datum shifts, and other associated constants were derived separately. For the unified solution, a normal equation matrix was formed based on each of the mentioned data sets. Then, the individual normal equation matrices were combined and the resultant matrix solved to obtain the positions and the parameters.

The semimajor axis (a) of the WGS 72 Ellipsoid is 6378135 m. The adoption of an a-value 10 meters smaller than that for the WGS 66 Ellipsoid was based on several calculations and indicators including a combination of satellite and surface gravity data for position and gravitational-field determinations. Sets of satellite-derived station coordinates and gravimetric deflection of the vertical and geoid height data were used to determine local-to-geocentric datum shifts, datum rotation parameters, a datum scale parameter, and a value for the semimajor axis of the WGS Ellipsoid. Eight solutions were made with the various sets of input data, both from an investigative point of view and also because of the limited number of unknowns which could be solved for in any individual solution due to computer limitations. Selected Doppler satellite-tracking and astro-geodetic datum orientation stations were included in the various solutions. Based on these results and other related studies accomplished by the committee, an a-value of 6378135 m and a flattening of 1/298.26 were adopted.

In the development of local-to WGS 72 datum shifts, results from different geodetic disciplines were investigated, analyzed, and compared. Those shifts adopted were based primarily on a large number of Doppler TRANET and GEOCEIVER station coordinates which were available worldwide. These coordinates had been determined using the Doppler point positioning method.

=== WGS 84 ===
Equatorial (a), polar (b), and mean Earth radii as defined in the 1984 World Geodetic System revision (not to scale)

In the early 1980s, the need for a new world geodetic system was generally recognized by the geodetic community as well as within the US Department of Defense. WGS 72 no longer provided sufficient data, information, geographic coverage, or product accuracy for all then-current and anticipated applications. The means for producing a new WGS were available in the form of improved data, increased data coverage, new data types, and improved techniques. Observations from Doppler, satellite laser ranging, and very-long-baseline interferometry (VLBI) constituted significant new information. An outstanding new source of data had become available from satellite radar altimetry. Also available was an advanced least-squares method called collocation that allowed for a consistent combination solution from different types of measurements all relative to the Earth's gravity field, measurements such as the geoid, gravity anomalies, deflections, and dynamic Doppler. The new world geodetic system was called WGS 84. It is the reference system used by the Global Positioning System.

The WGS 84 reference ellipsoid and normal gravity was derived from the GRS80's four parameters: equatorial radius or semimajor axis (a), second-degree zonal harmonic coefficient (J_{2}), geocentric gravitational constant (GM), and angular rotation rate (ω). Originally WGS 84 adopted most of the GRS80 parameters exactly, except for a normalization of the harmonic coefficient:
$$C_{2,0}=-J_2/\sqrt{5}$$
Because $\sqrt5$ is an irrational number, the value ended up truncated. Compared to GRS80, it resulted in a minor difference in derived geometric parameters, equivalent to only 0.1 mm in polar axis. In later updates, the WGS 84 reference ellipsoid remained unchanged (in terms of original a and truncated f), while the WGS 84 normal gravity model was modified (with improved GM and original ω).

Ellipsoid	Semi-major axis a	Semi-minor axis b	Inverse flattening 1/f
GRS 80	6378137.0 m	≈ 6356752.314140 m	298.257222100882711...
WGS 84	6378137.0 m	≈ 6356752.314245 m	298.257223563

The WGS 84 ellipsoid is an oblate spheroid with equatorial radius a = 6378137 m at the equator and flattening f = 1/298.257223563. The refined value of the WGS 84 gravitational constant (mass of Earth's atmosphere included) is GM = 3.986004418×10^{14} m^{3}/s^{2}. The angular velocity of the Earth is defined to be ω = 72.92115×10^{−6} rad/s. This leads to several computed parameters such as the polar semi-minor axis b, which equals a × (1 − f) = 6356752.3142 m, and the first eccentricity squared, e^{2} = 6.69437999014×10^{−3}.

==== Datum ====
WGS 84 reference frame. The oblateness of the ellipsoid is exaggerated in this image.

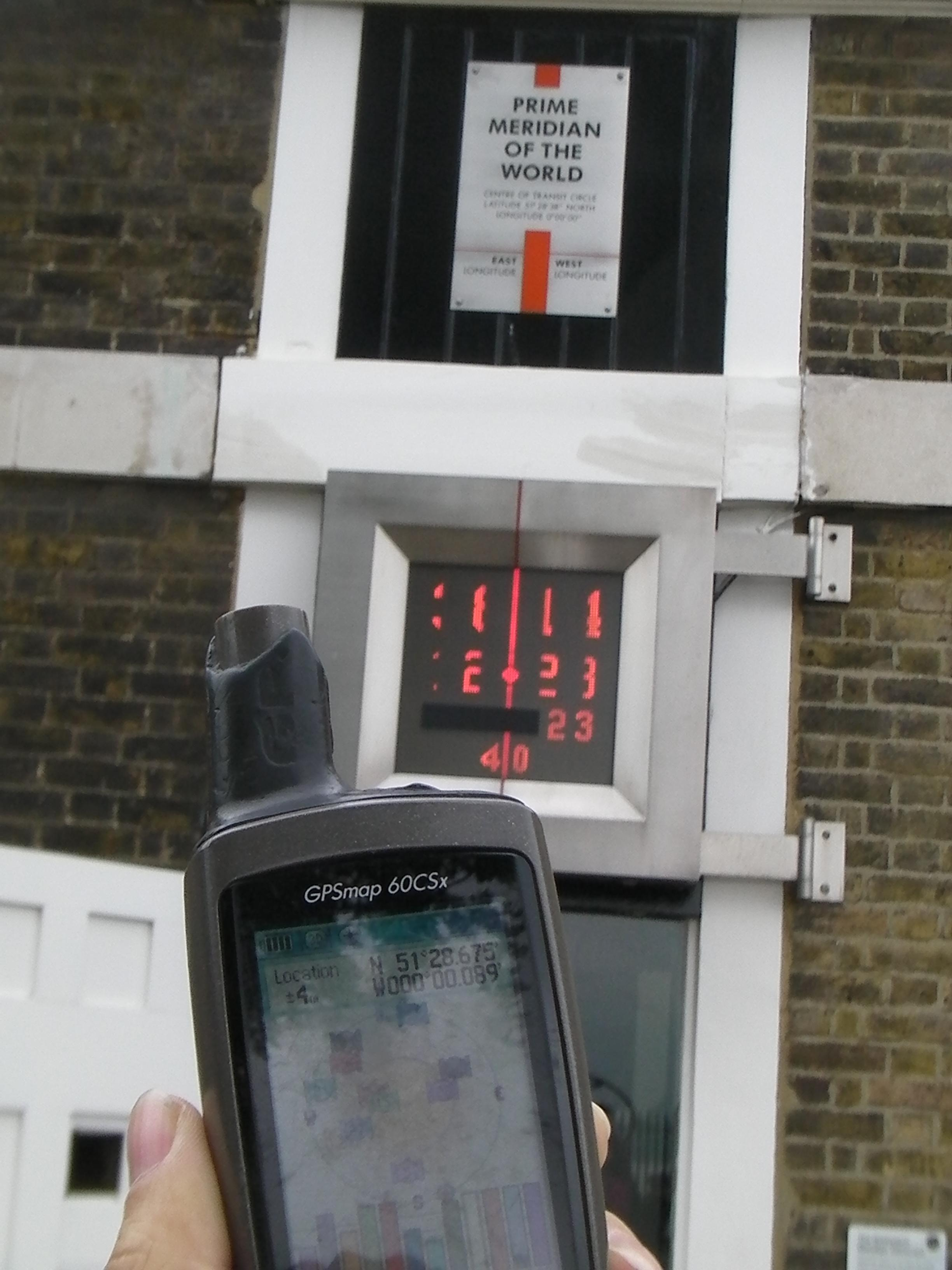
Handheld GPS receiver at the Royal Observatory, Greenwich, indicating that the Greenwich meridian is 0.089 arcminutes (or 5.34 arcseconds) west of the WGS 84 datum (the IERS Reference Meridian)

WGS 84 is geocentric and globally consistent within 1 m. Current geodetic realizations of the geocentric reference system family International Terrestrial Reference System (ITRS) maintained by the IERS are geocentric, and internally consistent, at the few-cm level, while still being meter-level consistent with WGS 84. The coordinate origin of WGS 84 is meant to be located at the Earth's center of mass; the uncertainty is believed to be less than 2 cm. The WGS 84 meridian of zero longitude is the IERS Reference Meridian, 5.3 arc seconds or 102 metres (335 ft) east of the Greenwich meridian at the latitude of the Royal Observatory. (This is related to the fact that the perpendicular to the local equipotential surface of the gravity field at Greenwich does not point exactly through the Earth's center of mass, but rather "misses west" of the center of mass by about 102 meters.) The longitude positions on WGS 84 agree with those on the older North American Datum 1927 at roughly 85° longitude west, in the east-central United States.

== Updates ==
The original standardization document for WGS 84 was Technical Report 8350.2, published in September 1987 by the Defense Mapping Agency (which later became the National Imagery and Mapping Agency). New editions were published in September 1991 and July 1997; the latter edition was amended twice, in January 2000 and June 2004. The standardization document was revised again and published in July 2014 by the National Geospatial-Intelligence Agency as NGA.STND.0036. These updates provide refined descriptions of the Earth and realizations of the system for higher precision.

The original WGS 84 model had an absolute accuracy of 1–2 meters. WGS 84 (G730) first incorporated GPS observations, taking the accuracy down to 10 cm/component rms. All following revisions including WGS 84 (G873) and WGS 84 (G1150) also used GPS.

WGS 84 (G1762) is the sixth update to the WGS reference frame.

WGS 84 has most recently been updated to use the reference frame G2296, which was released on 7 January 2024 as an update to G2139, now aligned to both the ITRF2020, the most recent ITRF realization, and the IGS20, the frame used by the International GNSS Service (IGS). G2139 was aligned with the IGb14 realization of the International Terrestrial Reference Frame (ITRF) 2014 and uses the new IGS Antex standard.

== Related models ==
Updates to the original geoid for WGS 84 are now published as a separate Earth Gravitational Model (EGM), with improved resolution and accuracy.

Likewise, the World Magnetic Model (WMM) is updated separately. The current version of WGS 84 uses EGM2008 and WMM2025.

Solution for Earth orientation parameters consistent with ITRF2014 is also needed (IERS EOP 14C04).

== Identifiers ==
Components of WGS 84 are identified by codes in the EPSG Geodetic Parameter Dataset:

- EPSG:4326 – 2D (latitude and longitude) coordinate reference system (CRS)
- EPSG:4979 – 3D (latitude, longitude, ellipsoidal height) CRS
- EPSG:4978 – 3D (geocentric Cartesian coordinates) CRS
- EPSG:7030 – reference ellipsoid
- EPSG:6326 – 3D datum

== See also ==
- Degree Confluence Project
- Earth Gravitational Model
- European Terrestrial Reference System 1989
- Geo (microformat) – for marking up WGS 84 coordinates in (X)HTML
- geo URI scheme
- Geographic information system
- Geotagging
- GIS file format
- Gladys West
- North American Datum
- Point of interest
- Timeline of Earth estimates
- TRANSIT system
