= Theoretical gravity =

Mathematical model of Earth's gravity

In geodesy and geophysics, theoretical gravity or normal gravity is an approximation of Earth's gravity, on or near its surface, by means of a mathematical model. The most common theoretical model is a rotating Earth ellipsoid of revolution (i.e., a spheroid).

Other representations of gravity can be used in the study and analysis of other bodies, such as asteroids. Widely used representations of a gravity field in the context of geodesy include spherical harmonics, mascon models, and polyhedral gravity representations.

== Principles ==
The type of gravity model used for the Earth depends upon the degree of fidelity required for a given problem. For many problems such as aircraft simulation, it may be sufficient to consider gravity to be a constant, defined as:

$g=g_{45}=$ 9.80665 m/s^{2} (32.1740 ft/s^{2})

based upon data from World Geodetic System 1984 (WGS-84), where $g$ is understood to be pointing 'down' in the local frame of reference.

If it is desirable to model an object's weight on Earth as a function of latitude, one could use the following:

$$g=g_{45} - \tfrac{1}{2}(g_{\mathrm{poles}}-g_{\mathrm{equator}}) \cos\left(2\, \varphi \cdot \frac{\pi}{180}\right)$$

where

- $g_{\mathrm{poles}}$ = 9.832 m/s^{2} (32.26 ft/s^{2})
- $g_{45}$ = 9.806 m/s^{2} (32.17 ft/s^{2})
- $g_{\mathrm{equator}}$ = 9.780 m/s^{2} (32.09 ft/s^{2})
- $\varphi$ = latitude, between −90° and +90°

Neither of these accounts for changes in gravity with changes in altitude, but the model with the cosine function does take into account the centrifugal relief that is produced by the rotation of the Earth. On the rotating sphere, the sum of the force of the gravitational field and the centrifugal force yields an angular deviation of approximately

$$\frac{\sin(2\varphi)}{2g}{R\Omega^2}$$

(in radians) between the direction of the gravitational field and the direction measured by a plumb line; the plumb line appears to point southwards on the northern hemisphere and northwards on the southern hemisphere. $\Omega\approx 7.29\times 10^{-5}$ rad/s is the diurnal angular speed of the Earth axis, and $R\approx 6370$ km the radius of the reference sphere, and $R\sin\varphi$ the distance of the point on the Earth crust to the Earth axis.

For the mass attraction effect by itself, the gravitational acceleration at the equator is about 0.18% less than that at the poles due to being located farther from the mass center. When the rotational component is included (as above), the gravity at the equator is about 0.53% less than that at the poles, with gravity at the poles being unaffected by the rotation. So the rotational component of change due to latitude (0.35%) is about twice as significant as the mass attraction change due to latitude (0.18%), but both reduce strength of gravity at the equator as compared to gravity at the poles.

Note that for satellites, orbits are decoupled from the rotation of the Earth so the orbital period is not necessarily one day, but also that errors can accumulate over multiple orbits so that accuracy is important. For such problems, the rotation of the Earth would be immaterial unless variations with longitude are modeled. Also, the variation in gravity with altitude becomes important, especially for highly elliptical orbits.

The Earth Gravitational Model 1996 (EGM96) contains 130,676 coefficients that refine the model of the Earth's gravitational field. The most significant correction term is about two orders of magnitude more significant than the next largest term. That coefficient is referred to as the $J_2$ term, and accounts for the flattening of the poles, or the oblateness, of the Earth. A gravitational potential function can be written for the change in potential energy for a unit mass that is brought from infinity into proximity to the Earth. Taking partial derivatives of that function with respect to a coordinate system will then resolve the directional components of the gravitational acceleration vector, as a function of location. The component due to the Earth's rotation can then be included, if appropriate, based on a sidereal day relative to the stars (≈366.24 days/year) rather than on a solar day (≈365.24 days/year). That component is perpendicular to the axis of rotation rather than to the surface of the Earth.

A similar model adjusted for the geometry and gravitational field for Mars can be found in publication NASA SP-8010.

The barycentric gravitational acceleration at a point in space is given by:

$$\mathbf{g}=-{G M \over r^2}\mathbf{\hat{r}}$$

where:

M is the mass of the attracting object, $\scriptstyle \mathbf{\hat{r}}$ is the unit vector from center-of-mass of the attracting object to the center-of-mass of the object being accelerated, r is the distance between the two objects, and G is the gravitational constant.

When this calculation is done for objects on the surface of the Earth, or aircraft that rotate with the Earth, one has to account for the fact that the Earth is rotating and the centrifugal acceleration has to be subtracted from this. For example, the equation above gives the acceleration at 9.820 m/s^{2}, when GM = 3.986 × 10^{14} m^{3}/s^{2}, and R = 6.371 × 10^{6} m. The centripetal radius is r = R cos(φ), and the centripetal time unit is approximately (day / 2π), reduces this, for r = 5 × 10^{6} metres, to 9.79379 m/s^{2}, which is closer to the observed value.

== Basic formulas ==
Various, successively more refined, formulas for computing the theoretical gravity are referred to as the International Gravity Formula, the first of which was proposed in 1930 by the International Association of Geodesy. The general shape of that formula is:

$$g(\phi)= g_e\left( 1 + A \sin^2(\phi) - B \sin^2(2 \phi) \right),$$

in which g(φ) is the gravity as a function of the geographic latitude φ of the position whose gravity is to be determined, $g_e$ denotes the gravity at the equator (as determined by measurement), and the coefficients A and B are parameters that must be selected to produce a good global fit to true gravity.

Using the values of the GRS80 reference system, a commonly used specific instantiation of the formula above is given by:

$g(\phi)= 9.780327 \left(1+0.0053024\sin^2(\phi) - 0.0000058\sin^2(2 \phi) \right)\,\mathrm{ms}^{-2}.$

Using the appropriate double-angle formula in combination with the Pythagorean identity, this can be rewritten in the equivalent forms

$$\begin{align}g(\phi)&= 9.780327 \left(1+0.0052792\sin^2(\phi)+0.0000232\sin^4(\phi)\right)\,\mathrm{ms}^{-2},\\
&=9.780327\left(1.0053024-.0053256\cos^2(\phi)+.0000232\cos^4(\phi)\right)\,\mathrm{ms}^{-2},\\
&=9.780327\left(1.0026454-0.0026512\cos(2\phi)+
.0000058\cos^2(2\phi)\right)\,\mathrm{ms}^{-2}
.\end{align}\,\!$$

Up to the 1960s, formulas based on the Hayford ellipsoid (1924) and of the famous German geodesist Helmert (1906) were often used. The difference between the semi-major axis (equatorial radius) of the Hayford ellipsoid and that of the modern WGS84 ellipsoid is 251 m; for Helmert's ellipsoid it is only 63 m.

== Somigliana equation ==
A more recent theoretical formula for gravity as a function of latitude is the International Gravity Formula 1980 (IGF80), also based on the GRS80 ellipsoid but now using the Somigliana equation (after Carlo Somigliana (1860–1955)):

$$g(\phi)=g_e\left[\frac{1+k\sin^2(\phi)}{\sqrt{1-e^2 \sin^2(\phi)}}\right],\,\!$$

where,

- $k=\frac{b g_p-a g_e}{a g_e}$ (formula constant);
- $g_e,g_p$ is the defined gravity at the equator and poles, respectively;
- $a,b$ are the equatorial and polar semi-axes, respectively;
- $e^2=\frac{a^2-b^2}{a^2}$ is the spheroid's squared eccentricity;

providing,

$g(\phi)= 9.7803267715\left[\frac{1+0.001931851353\sin^2(\phi)}{\sqrt{1-0.0066943800229\sin^2(\phi)}}\right]\,\mathrm{ms}^{-2}.$

A later refinement, based on the WGS84 ellipsoid, is the WGS (World Geodetic System) 1984 Ellipsoidal Gravity Formula:

$$g(\phi)=9.7803253359\left[\frac{1+0.00193185265241\sin^2(\phi)}{\sqrt{1-0.00669437999013\sin^2(\phi)}}\right] \,\mathrm{ms}^{-2}.$$

(where $g_p$ = 9.8321849378 ms^{−2})

The difference with IGF80 is insignificant when used for geophysical purposes, but may be significant for other uses.

=== Further details ===
For the normal gravity $\gamma_0$ of the sea level ellipsoid, i.e., elevation h = 0, this formula by Somigliana (1929) applies:

$$\gamma_0(\varphi) = \frac{a \cdot \gamma_a \cdot \cos^2 \varphi + b \cdot \gamma_b \cdot \sin^2 \varphi}{\sqrt{a^2 \cdot \cos^2 \varphi + b^2 \cdot \sin^2 \varphi}}$$

with

- $\gamma_a$ = Normal gravity at Equator
- $\gamma_b$ = Normal gravity at poles
- a = semi-major axis (Equator radius)
- b = semi-minor axis (pole radius)
- $\varphi$ = latitude

Due to numerical issues, the formula is simplified to this:

$$\gamma_0 (\varphi) = \gamma_a \cdot \frac{1+p\cdot \sin^2\varphi}{\sqrt{1 - e^2 \cdot \sin^2 \varphi}}$$

with

- $p = \frac{b \cdot \gamma_b}{a \cdot \gamma_a} - 1$
- $e^2 = 1 - \frac{b^2}{a^2}; \quad$(e is the eccentricity)

For the Geodetic Reference System 1980 (GRS 80) the parameters are set to these values:

$$a = 6\,378\,137 \, \mathrm{m} \quad \quad \quad            \quad b = 6\,356\,752{.}314\,1 \, \mathrm{m}$$

$$\gamma_a = 9{.}780\,326\,771\,5 \, \mathrm{\frac{m}{s^2}} \quad \gamma_b = 9{.}832\,186\,368\,5 \, \mathrm{\frac{m}{s^2}}$$

$\Rightarrow p = 1{.}931\,851\,353 \cdot 10^{-3} \quad e^2 = 6{.}694\,380\,022\,90 \cdot 10^{-3}$

== Approximation formula from series expansions ==
The Somigliana formula was approximated through different series expansions, following this scheme:

$$\gamma_0(\varphi) = \gamma_a \cdot (1 + \beta \cdot \sin^2 \varphi + \beta_1 \cdot \sin^2 2\varphi + \dots)$$

=== International gravity formula 1930 ===
The normal gravity formula by Gino Cassinis was determined in 1930 by International Union of Geodesy and Geophysics as international gravity formula along with Hayford ellipsoid. The parameters are:

$$\gamma_a = 9{.}78049 \frac{\mathrm{m}}{\mathrm{s}^2} \quad \beta = 5{.}2884 \cdot 10^{-3} \quad \beta_1 = -5{.}9 \cdot 10^{-6}$$

In the course of time the values were improved again with newer knowledge and more exact measurement methods.

Harold Jeffreys improved the values in 1948 at:

$$\gamma_a = 9{.}780373 \frac{\mathrm{m}}{\mathrm{s}^2} \quad \beta = 5{.}2891 \cdot 10^{-3} \quad \beta_1 = -5{.}9 \cdot 10^{-6}$$

=== International gravity formula 1967 ===
The normal gravity formula of Geodetic Reference System 1967 is defined with the values:

$$\gamma_a = 9{.}780318 \frac{\mathrm{m}}{\mathrm{s}^2} \quad \beta = 5{.}3024 \cdot 10^{-3} \quad \beta_1 = -5{.}9 \cdot 10^{-6}$$

=== International gravity formula 1980 ===
From the parameters of GRS 80 comes the classic series expansion:

$$\gamma_a = 9{.}780327 \frac{\mathrm{m}}{\mathrm{s}^2} \quad \beta = 5{.}3024 \cdot 10^{-3} \quad \beta_1 = -5{.}8 \cdot 10^{-6}$$

The accuracy is about ±10^{−6} m/s^{2}.

With GRS 80 the following series expansion is also introduced:

$$\gamma_0(\varphi) = \gamma_a \cdot (1 + c_1 \cdot \sin^2 \varphi + c_2 \cdot \sin^4 \varphi + c_3 \cdot \sin^6 \varphi + c_4 \cdot \sin^8\varphi + \dots)$$

As such the parameters are:

- c_{1} = 5.279 0414·10^{−3}
- c_{2} = 2.327 18·10^{−5}
- c_{3} = 1.262·10^{−7}
- c_{4} = 7·10^{−10}

The accuracy is at about ±10^{−9} m/s^{2} exact. When the exactness is not required, the terms at further back can be omitted. But it is recommended to use this finalized formula.

== Height dependence ==
Cassinis determined the height dependence, as:

$$g(\varphi, h) = g_0(\varphi) - \left( 3{.}08 \cdot 10^{-6} \, \frac{1}{\mathrm{s}^2} - 4{.}19 \cdot 10^{-7} \, \frac{\mathrm{cm}^3}{\mathrm{g}\cdot \mathrm{s}^2} \cdot \rho \right) \cdot h$$

The average rock density ρ is no longer considered.

Since GRS 1967 the dependence on the ellipsoidal elevation h is:

$$\begin{align}
g(\varphi, h) & = g_0(\varphi) - \left( 1 - 1{.}39 \cdot 10^{-3} \cdot \sin^2(\varphi) \right) \cdot 3{.}0877 \cdot 10^{-6} \, \frac{1}{\mathrm{s}^2} \cdot h + 7{.}2 \cdot 10^{-13} \, \frac{1}{\mathrm{m} \cdot \mathrm{s}^2} \cdot h^2\\
& = g_0(\varphi) - \left( 3{.}0877 \cdot 10^{-6} - 4{.}3 \cdot 10^{-9} \cdot \sin^2(\varphi) \right) \, \frac{1}{\mathrm{s}^2} \cdot h + 7{.}2 \cdot 10^{-13} \, \frac{1}{\mathrm{m} \cdot \mathrm{s}^2} \cdot h^2
\end{align}$$

Another expression is:

$$g(\varphi,h) = g_0(\varphi) \cdot (1 - (k_1 - k_2 \cdot \sin^2 \varphi) \cdot h + k_3 \cdot h^2)$$

with the parameters derived from GRS80:

- $k_1 = 2 \cdot (1 + f + m) / a = 3{.}157\,04\cdot10^{-7} \, \mathrm{m^{-1}}$
- $k_2 = 4 \cdot f / a = 2{.}102\,69\cdot10^{-9} \, \mathrm{m^{-1}}$
- $k_3 = 3 / (a^2) = 7{.}374\,52\cdot10^{-14} \, \mathrm{m^{-2}}$

where $m$ with $\omega = 7.2921150 \cdot 10^{-5} \ rad \cdot s^{-1}$:

$$m = \frac{\omega^2 \cdot a^2 \cdot b}{GM}$$

This adjustment is about right for common heights in aviation; but for heights up to outer space (over ca. 100 kilometers) it is out of range.

== WELMEC formula ==
In all German standards offices the free-fall acceleration g is calculated in respect to the average latitude φ and the average height above sea level h with the WELMEC–Formel:

$$g(\varphi, h) = \left( 1 + 0{.}0053024 \cdot \sin^2(\varphi) - 0{.}0000058 \cdot \sin^2(2 \varphi) \right) \cdot 9{.}780318 \frac{\mathrm{m}}{\mathrm{s}^2} - 0{.}000003085 \, \frac{1}{\mathrm{s}^2} \cdot h$$

The formula is based on the International gravity formula from 1967.

The scale of free-fall acceleration at a certain place must be determined with precision measurement of several mechanical magnitudes. Weighing scales, the mass of which does measurement because of the weight, relies on the free-fall acceleration, thus for use they must be prepared with different constants in different places of use. Through the concept of so-called gravity zones, which are divided with the use of normal gravity, a weighing scale can be calibrated by the manufacturer before use.

== Example ==
Free-fall acceleration in Schweinfurt:

Data:

- Latitude: 50° 3′ 24″ = 50.0567°
- Height above sea level: 229.7 m
- Density of the rock plates: ca. 2.6 g/cm^{3}
- Measured free-fall acceleration: g = 9.8100 ± 0.0001 m/s^{2}

Free-fall acceleration, calculated through normal gravity formulas:

- Cassinis: g = 9.81038 m/s^{2}
- Jeffreys: g = 9.81027 m/s^{2}
- WELMEC: g = 9.81004 m/s^{2}

== See also ==
- Gravity anomaly
- Reference ellipsoid
- EGM96 (Earth Gravitational Model 1996)
- Standard gravity : 9.806 65 m/s^{2}
- Normal potential
