= Battleship Bismarck: Operation Rhine - May 1941 =

1987 video game

- Publisher: General Quarters Software
- Platforms: Apple II, MS-DOS
- Release: 1987

Battleship Bismarck: Operation Rhine - May 1941 is a computer wargame published in 1987 by General Quarters Software.

== Gameplay ==
Battleship Bismarck is a game in which one player is German Admiral Lutjens commanding the battleship Bismarck to raid Atlantic commercial ships while the other player is British Admiral Tovey trying to sink Bismarck.

== Reception ==
Wyatt Lee reviewed the game for Computer Gaming World, and compared it to Action in the North Atlantic and stated that "players who like one of these games will definitely like the other."

The book The PC Games Bible said that "The centre point is the recreation of the gunnery battle between the Bismarck and the HMS Hood and Prince of Wales, but unlimited 'what-if' scenarios can be created."

== See also ==
- Banzai: Death Sortie of the Yamato
