= Action in the North Atlantic (video game) =

1989 video game

- Developer: General Quarters Software
- Publisher: General Quarters Software
- Platform: MS-DOS
- Release: 1989

Action in the North Atlantic is a 1989 video game published by General Quarters Software.

== Gameplay ==
Game introduction title screen

Action in the North Atlantic is a game in which convoys are bound for Murmansk in spring 1942. The player can choose either to disrupt those convoys as Grand Admiral Doenitz, or defend them as Fleet Admiral Pound.

== Reception ==
Bob Proctor for Computer Gaming World commented that "Action in the North Atlantic is a solid naval strategy wargame for those who do not live and die by state of the art graphics. Like Battleship Bismarck, the research is there, the strategies are varied and, fortunately for Action in the North Atlantic, the scenario is much more flexible."

Wyatt Lee reviewed the game for Computer Gaming World, and stated that "the game play is fast and efficient. Those who like to play miniatures rules like General Quarters (no relation to the software publisher) should not be disappointed and those who want a strategy game that can be finished in an hour to an hour and a half should be delighted."

The book The PC Games Bible said that "The graphics are very average, and the GQS interface takes some getting used to."

== See also ==
- Battleship Bismarck: Operation Rhine - May 1941
- Banzai: Death Sortie of the Yamato
