= Banzai: Death Sortie of the Yamato =

1991 video game

- Publisher: General Quarters Software
- Platform: Apple II
- Release: 1991
- Genre: Turn-based strategy

Banzai: Death Sortie of the Yamato is a 1991 video game published by General Quarters Software.

== Gameplay ==
Banzai: Death Sortie of the Yamato is a game in which the Japanese battleship Yamato tries to reach Okinawa while successfully escaping detection from the Allied naval forces.

== Reception ==
H. E. Dille reviewed the game for Computer Gaming World, and stated that "Since this particular designer has provided hours of enjoyment in the past, one can only hope his next effort does not require such a Sisyphus-like effort in terms of play balance."

The book The PC Games Bible describes the game system as "idiosyncratic" and that "it seems impossible to avoid anything other than the historical result", and concludes by saying that "GQS products are an acquired taste, and if this is to be your first nibble, another GQS title - for example the Midway titles might give more balanced game play. A title for the naval enthusiast."

== See also ==
- Action in the North Atlantic
- Battleship Bismarck: Operation Rhine - May 1941
