= Earth Gravitational Model =

Geopotential descriptions used by the US DoD

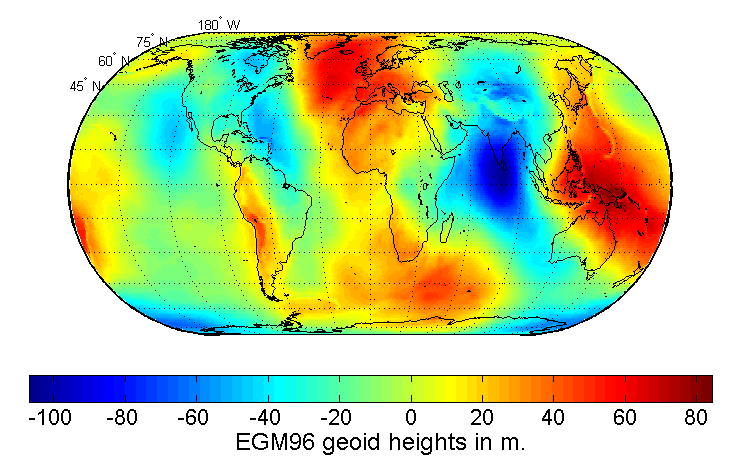
A view of the Earth's geoid, as provided by EGM96

The Earth Gravitational Models (EGM) are a series of geopotential models of the Earth published by the National Geospatial-Intelligence Agency (NGA). They are used as the geoid reference in the World Geodetic System.

The NGA provides the models in two formats: as the series of numerical coefficients to the spherical harmonics which define the model, or a dataset giving the geoid height at each coordinate at a given resolution.

Three model versions have been published: EGM84 with n=m=180, EGM96 with n=m=360, and EGM2008 with n=m=2160. n and m are the degree and orders of harmonic coefficients; the higher they are, the more parameters the models have, and the more precise they are. EGM2008 also contains expansions to n=2190. Developmental versions of the EGM are referred to as Preliminary Gravitational Models (PGMs).

Each version of EGM has its own EPSG Geodetic Parameter Dataset code as a vertical datum.

== Series ==
=== EGM84 ===
The first EGM, EGM84, was defined as a part of WGS84 along with its reference ellipsoid. WGS84 combines the old GRS 80 with the then-latest data, namely available Doppler, satellite laser ranging, and very-long-baseline interferometry (VLBI) observations, and a new least squares method called collocation. It allowed for a model with n=m=180 to be defined, providing a raster for every half degree (30', 30 minute) of latitude and longitude of the world. NIMA also computed and made available 30′×30′ mean altimeter derived gravity anomalies from the GEOSAT Geodetic Mission. 15′×15′ is also available.

=== EGM96 ===
EGM96 from 1996 is the result of a collaboration between the National Imagery and Mapping Agency (NIMA), the NASA Goddard Space Flight Center (GSFC), and the Ohio State University. It exploited new surface gravity data from many different regions of the globe, including data newly released from the NIMA archives. Major terrestrial gravity acquisitions by NIMA since 1990 include airborne gravity surveys over Greenland and parts of the Arctic and the Antarctic, surveyed by the United States Naval Research Laboratory (NRL) and cooperative gravity collection projects, several of which were undertaken with the University of Leeds. These collection efforts have improved the data holdings over many of the world's land areas, including Africa, Canada, parts of South America and Africa, Southeast Asia, Eastern Europe, and the former Soviet Union. Further, there have been major efforts to improve NIMA's existing 30' mean anomaly database through contributions over various countries in Asia. EGM96 also included altimeter derived anomalies derived from European Remote-Sensing Satellite (ERS-1) by Kort & Matrikelstyrelsen (KMS), (National Survey and Cadastre, Denmark) over portions of the Arctic, and the Antarctic, as well as the altimeter derived anomalies of Schoene [1996] over the Weddell Sea. The raster from EGM96 is provided at 15'x15' resolution.

EGM96 is a composite solution, consisting of:

1. a combination solution to degree and order 70,
2. a block diagonal solution from degree 71 to 359,
3. and the quadrature solution at degree 360.

PGM2000A is an EGM96 derivative model that incorporates normal equations for the dynamic ocean topography implied by the POCM4B ocean general circulation model.

=== EGM2008 ===
The official Earth Gravitational Model EGM2008 was publicly released by the National Geospatial-Intelligence Agency (NGA) EGM Development Team in 2008. Among other new data sources, the GRACE satellite mission provided a very high-resolution model of the global gravity. This gravitational model is complete to spherical harmonic degree and order 2159 (block diagonal) and contains additional coefficients extending to degree 2190 and order 2159. As with all spherical harmonic models, EGM2008 can be truncated to have fewer coefficients with lower resolution.

=== EGM2020 ===
EGM2020 is to be a new release (still not released as of July 2025) with the same structure as EGM2008, but with improved accuracy by incorporating newer data. It was originally planned to be released in April 2020. It was reportedly complete in May 2020.

== Related models ==
=== Experimental models ===
The precursor version XGM2016 (X stands for experimental) was released in 2016 up to degree and order (d/o) 719.

XGM2019e was released in 2020 up to spheroidal d/o 5399 (that corresponds to a spatial resolution of 2′ which is ~4 km) and spherical d/o 5540 with a different spheroidal harmonic construction followed by conversion back into spherical harmonics. It was made by authors affiliated with the Technical University of Munich. The data are available for download through the ICGEM (International Centre for Global Earth Models).

XGM2020 was announced in May 2020 with d/o 5400. It uses a fusion of data sources: 15' NGA 2018 data over land, higher-definition EARTH 2014 over land, and OGMOC mean dynamic topography (MDT) + DTU 18 mean sea surface over oceans. It is capable of being a MDT that recovers valid sea current features. Unfortunately, the data are not available for download.

=== Alternative improvements over EGM2008 ===
John Milsom wrote in 2023 that the more important alternative improvements of EGM2008 are WGM2012 (prepared by the Bureau Gravimetrique International) and GGMplus (a collaboration between Curtin University and the Technical University of Munich). He also cautions against the use of "high-resolution" global gravity models in mineral exploration as it is partly based on data sources that make use of a topography-based "standard density" ignoring the true density variations present (representing a quasigeoid in those parts).

The ICGEM (International Centre for Global Earth Models), coordinated by the International Gravity Field Service of the International Association of Geodesy, is the main archive of whole-Earth gravity field models. In addition to static models like EGM, it also includes more sophisticated time-varying models commonly used for satellite orbit determination.

== See also ==
- ETRS89
- NAD83
