= Geodetic Reference System 1980 =

Collection of data on Earth's gravity and shape

The Geodetic Reference System 1980 (GRS80) consists of a global reference ellipsoid and a normal gravity model. The GRS80 gravity model has been followed by the newer more accurate Earth Gravitational Models, but the GRS80 reference ellipsoid is still the most accurate in use for coordinate reference systems, e.g. for the international ITRS, the European ETRS89 and (with a 0,1 mm rounding error) for WGS 84 used for the American Global Navigation Satellite System (GPS).

== Background ==
Geodesy is the scientific discipline that deals with the measurement and representation of the earth, its gravitational field and geodynamic phenomena (polar motion, earth tides, and crustal motion) in three-dimensional, time-varying space.

The geoid is essentially the figure of the Earth abstracted from its topographic features. It is an idealized equilibrium surface of sea water, the mean sea level surface in the absence of currents, air pressure variations etc. and continued under the continental masses. The geoid, unlike the ellipsoid, is irregular and too complicated to serve as the computational surface on which to solve geometrical problems like point positioning. The geometrical separation between it and the reference ellipsoid is called the geoidal undulation, or more usually the geoid-ellipsoid separation, N. It varies globally between ±110 m.

A reference ellipsoid, customarily chosen to be the same size (volume) as the geoid, is described by its semi-major axis (equatorial radius) a and flattening f. The quantity f = (a−b)/a, where b is the semi-minor axis (polar radius), is a purely geometrical one. The mechanical ellipticity of the earth (dynamical flattening, symbol J_{2}) is determined to high precision by observation of satellite orbit perturbations. Its relationship with the geometric flattening is indirect. The relationship depends on the internal density distribution.

The 1980 Geodetic Reference System (GRS 80) posited a 6378137 m semi-major axis and a 1/298.257222101 flattening. This system was recommened in Resolution 7 of the XVII General Assembly of the International Union of Geodesy and Geophysics (IUGG) in Canberra, Australia, 1979.

The GRS 80 reference system was originally used by the World Geodetic System 1984 (WGS 84), with a slight truncation.

The numerous other systems which have been used by diverse countries for their maps and charts are gradually dropping out of use as more and more countries move to global, geocentric reference systems using the GRS80 reference ellipsoid.

== Definition ==
The reference ellipsoid is fully defined by two geometrical parameters: semi-major axis (equatorial radius) $a$ and either its semi-minor axis (polar radius) $b$, aspect ratio $(b/a)$, flattening $f$, or eccentricity $e$. A normal gravity model requires additional gravimetric parameters: the geocentric gravitational constant $GM$ and either the second dynamic form factor $J_2$ or the angular rotation rate $\omega$. There is some dependency among the above parameters; for example, $J_2$ is related to $f$, $a$, $\omega$, and $GM$. GRS80 is both a reference ellipsoid and a normal gravity model, so it is specifid with four parameters:

$$a = 6\,378\,137\,\mathrm{m}$$;
$$J_2 = 108\,263\times10^{-8}$$;
$$GM = 3986005\times10^8\, \mathrm{m^3/s^2}$$;
$$\omega = 7\,292\,115\times10^{-11}\, \mathrm{s^{-1}}$$.

== Derived quantities ==
Derived geometrical constants (all rounded)
Flattening = $f$ = 0.003 352 810 681 183 637 418;
Reciprocal of flattening = $1/f$ = 298.257 222 100 882 711 243;
Semi-minor axis = Polar Radius = $b$ = 6 356 752.314 140 347 m;
Aspect ratio = $b/a$ = 0.996 647 189 318 816 363;
Mean radius as defined by the International Union of Geodesy and Geophysics (IUGG): $R_1 = (2a+b)/3$ = 6 371 008.7714 m;
Authalic mean radius = $R_2$ = 6 371 007.1809 m;
Radius of a sphere of the same volume = $R_3 = (a^2b)^{1/3}$ = 6 371 000.7900 m;
Linear eccentricity = $c = \sqrt{a^2-b^2}$ = 521 854.0097 m;
Eccentricity of elliptical section through poles = $e = \frac{\sqrt{a^2-b^2}}{a}$ = 0.081 819 191 0428;
Polar radius of curvature = $a^2/b$ = 6 399 593.6259 m;
Equatorial radius of curvature for a meridian = $b^2/a$ = 6 335 439.3271 m;
Meridian quadrant = 10 001 965.7292 m;

Derived physical constants (rounded)
Period of rotation (sidereal day) = $2\pi/\omega$ = 86 164.100 637 s

The formula giving the eccentricity of the GRS80 spheroid is:

$$e^2  =  \frac {a^2 - b^2}{a^2} = 3J_2 + \frac4{15} \frac{\omega^2 a^3}{GM} \frac{e^3}{2q_0},$$

where

$$2q_0 = \left(1 + \frac3{e'^2}\right) \arctan e' - \frac3{e'}$$

and $e' = \frac{e}{\sqrt{1 - e^2}}$ (so $\arctan e' = \arcsin e$). The equation is solved iteratively to give

$$e^2 = 0.00669\,43800\,22903\,41574\,95749\,48586\,28930\,62124\,43890\,\ldots$$

which gives

$$f = 1/298.25722\,21008\,82711\,24316\,28366\,\ldots.$$

== See also ==
- Hayford ellipsoid
- Lucern ellipsoid
