= Normal height =

Altitude above quasigeoid or mean sea level

Normal heights (symbol $H^*$ or $H^N$; SI unit metre, m) is a type of height above sea level introduced by the Soviet scientist Mikhail Molodenskii. The normal height of a point is defined as the quotient of a point's geopotential number C (i.e. its geopotential difference with that of sea level), by the vertically averaged normal gravity:

$$H^N=C/\bar\gamma$$

The average is evaluated along the normal potential's plumb line (a curve, approximated by the ellipsoidal normal, a straight line). The evaluation ranges from the Earth ellipsoid up to the point of interest; the procedure is thus recursive. Normal heights are slightly dependent upon the reference ellipsoid chosen.

Normal gravity values are easier to compute compared to actual gravity, as one does not have to know the Earth's crust density. This is an advantage of normal heights compared to orthometric heights.

The reference surface where normal heights are zero is called the quasi-geoid (or quasigeoid), a representation of mean sea level similar to the geoid and close to it, but lacking the physical interpretation of an equigeopotential surface. The geoid undulation $N$ with respect to the reference ellipsoid, $N=h-H$, finds an analogue in the so-called height anomaly, $\zeta$ (lowercase zeta):

$$\zeta=h-H^N$$

The geoid–quasigeoid separation (GQS), $N-\zeta$, is zero over the oceans and maximum in the Himalayas, where it attains approximately 5 meters.

Russia and many other Eastern European countries have adopted a height system based on normal heights. In practice, it is determined starting with geodetic levelling and applying correction terms.

Alternatives to normal heights include orthometric heights (geoid-based) and dynamic heights.

== See also ==
- Physical geodesy
