= Potential =

Currently unrealized ability

Potential generally refers to a currently unrealized ability. The term is used in a wide variety of fields, from physics to the social sciences to indicate things that are in a state where they are able to change in ways ranging from the simple release of energy by objects to the realization of abilities in people.

The philosopher Aristotle incorporated this concept into his theory of potentiality and actuality (in Greek, dynamis and energeia), translated into Latin as potentia and actualitas (earlier also possibilitas and efficacia). a pair of closely connected principles which he used to analyze motion, causality, ethics, and physiology in his Physics, Metaphysics, Nicomachean Ethics, and De Anima, which is about the human psyche. That which is potential can theoretically be made actual by taking the right action; for example, a boulder on the edge of a cliff has potential to fall that could be actualized by pushing it over the edge.

In physics, a potential may refer to the scalar potential or to the vector potential. In either case, it is a field defined in space, from which many important physical properties may be derived. Leading examples are the gravitational potential and the electric potential, from which the motion of gravitating or electrically charged bodies may be obtained. Specific forces have associated potentials, including the Coulomb potential, the van der Waals potential, the Lennard-Jones potential and the Yukawa potential. In electrochemistry there are Galvani potential, Volta potential, electrode potential, and standard electrode potential. In the thermodynamics, the term potential often refers to thermodynamic potential.

== Etymology ==
"Potential" comes from the Latin word potentialis, from potentia = might, force, power, and hence ability, faculty, capacity, authority, influence. From the verb posse = to be able, to have power. From the adjective potis = able, capable. (The old form of the verb was a compound of the adjective and the verb "to be", e.g. for possum it was potis sum, etc.) The Latin word potis is cognate with the Sanskrit word patis = "lord".

Several languages have a potential mood, a grammatical construction which indicates that something is in a potential as opposed to actual state. These include Finnish, Japanese, and Sanskrit.

== See also ==
- Potential difference (voltage)
- Potential energy
- Water potential
