= GNSS software-defined receiver =

GNSS receiver implemented in software

A software GNSS receiver is a Global Navigation Satellite System (GNSS) receiver that has been designed and implemented using software-defined radio stations.

A GNSS receiver, in general, is an electronic device that receives and digitally processes the signals from a navigation satellite constellation in order to provide position, velocity and time (of the receiver).

GNSS receivers have been traditionally implemented in hardware: a hardware GNSS receiver is conceived as a dedicated chip that has been designed and built (from the very beginning) with the only purpose of being a GNSS receiver.

In a software GNSS receiver, all digital processing is performed by a general purpose microprocessor. In this approach, a small amount of inexpensive hardware is still needed, known as the frontend, that digitizes the signal from the satellites. The microprocessor can then work on this raw digital stream to implement the GNSS functionality.

ISRO's GNSS receiver at 9th Bengaluru Space Expo 2026, BIEC

== Hardware vs. software GNSS receivers ==
When comparing hardware vs software GNSS receivers, a number of pros and cons can be found for each approach:

- Hardware GNSS receivers are in general more efficient from the point of view of both computational load and power consumption since they have been designed in a highly specialized way with the only purpose of implementing the GNSS processing.
- Software GNSS receivers allow a huge flexibility: many features of the receiver can be modified just through software. This provides the receiver with adaptive capabilities, depending on the user's needs and working conditions. In addition, the receiver can be easily upgraded via software.
- Under some assumptions, Software GNSS receivers can be more profitable for some applications, as long as sufficient computational power is available (and can be shared among multiple applications). For example, the microprocessor of a smartphone can be used to provide GNSS navigation with the only need of including a frontend (instead of a full, more expensive, hardware receiver).

Currently, most of the GNSS receiver market is still hardware. However, there already exist operational solutions based on the software approach able to run on low-cost microprocessors. Software GNSS receivers are expected to increase their market share or even take over in the near future, following the development of the computational capabilities of the microprocessors (Moore's law).

== Comparison of GNSS SDR implementations ==
- Galileo Satellite Navigation LTD.- GSN:
  - Business Model - IP core license + royalties
  - Development
    - Programming language: C
    - User interface - NMEA
  - Hardware support:
    - Platforms
      - PC - windows
      - PC - Linux
      - CEVA - XC family
      - CEVA - TL3/4
      - Cadence (Tensilica) - BBE16/32
    - RF FE
      - MAXIM
      - NEC
  - GNSS/SBAS signals support:
    - GPS: L1/CA,
    - GLONASS: G1
    - Galileo: E1,
    - BeiDou: B1
    - SBAS
    - QZSS: L1/CA
  - Features:
    - Acquisition: yes
    - Tracking: yes
    - Generating pseudo-range observable: yes
    - Decoding navigation data: yes
    - Position estimation: yes
    - Maximum number of real-time channels demonstrated: 16/system
    - Multi-correlator: yes
    - Sample data recording: yes
- SX3 (formerly SX-NSR)
  - General information:
    - Publication: https://gpsworld.com/software-gnss-receiver-an-answer-for-precise-positioning-research
  - Development:
    - Programming language: C++
    - User interface (none, CLI, GUI): CLI, GUI
    - Under active development (as-of date): yes (2016-Mar-17)
    - Creator/sponsor organization: IfEN GmbH, Germany
    - Latest release (version and date): v3.2.1, March 2016
    - First release (version and date): v1.0, March 2007
  - Hardware support:
    - Front-ends: NavPort, NavPort-4, SX3 frontend
    - Host computer special hardware supported: SIMD (SSE2, SSSE3), CUDA
    - Multicore supported: yes
  - GNSS/SBAS signals support:
    - GPS: L1CA, L2C, L2P (codeless), L5
    - GLONASS: G1, G2
    - Galileo: E1, E5a, E5b, E5ab (AltBOC), E6
    - BeiDou: B1, B2
    - SBAS: EGNOS
    - QZSS: L110CAdieyure
    - IRNSS: L5, S-Band
  - Features:
    - Acquisition: yes (several algorithms)
    - Tracking: yes (several algorithms)
    - Generating pseudo-range observable: yes
    - Generating carrier-phase observable: yes
    - Decoding navigation data: yes
    - Spectrum analyzer: yes
    - Position estimation: yes
    - Maximum number of real-time channels demonstrated: 490 (GPS L1 C/A channels @20 MHz sample rate, 3 correlators per channel, INTEL Core i7-4970K processor (not over clocked) )
    - Application programming interface: yes
    - Dual antenna support: yes
    - Scintillation monitoring: yes
    - Multi-correlator: yes
    - Sample data recording: yes
    - Multipath mitigation: yes (several algorithms)
- GNSS-SDRLIB
  - General information:
    - Publication:
    - Software licence: GNU General Public License 2+
  - Development:
    - Programming language: C
    - User interface (none, CLI, GUI): CLI, GUI.
    - Number of developers: 1?
    - Under active development (as-of date): yes (2013-Sep-25)
    - Creator/sponsor organization: Tokyo University of Marine Science and Technology, Japan
    - Latest release (version and date):
    - First release (version and date):
  - Hardware support:
    - Front-ends: NSL STEREO v2 and SiGe GN3S Sampler v3
    - Host computer special hardware supported: SIMD (SSE2 and AVX)
    - Multicore supported?:
  - GNSS/SBAS signals support:
    - GPS: L1CA, L1C, L2C, L5
    - GLONASS: G1, G2
    - Galileo: E1, E5a, E5b
    - BeiDou: B1
    - QZSS: LEX
  - Features:
    - Acquisition: yes
    - Tracking: yes
    - Generating pseudo-range: yes
    - Decoding navigation data: yes
    - Spectrum analysis: yes
    - Position estimation: yes (through RTKLIB)
    - Maximum number of real-time channels demonstrated: ?
- ARAMIS (formerly iPRx)
  - Versions:
    - Free academic version
    - Ionospheric Scintillation Monitor receiver
    - R&D version
  - General information:
    - Publication: http://www.cambridge.org/us/academic/subjects/engineering/communications-and-signal-processing/digital-satellite-navigation-and-geophysics-practical-guide-gnss-signal-simulator-and-receiver-laboratory
  - Development:
    - Programming language: C++
    - User interface : GUI
    - Under active development (as-of date): yes (2014-Nov)
    - Creator/sponsor organization: iP-Solutions, Japan, JAXA, Japan
    - Latest release (version and date): February 2018
    - First release (version and date): April 2008
  - Hardware support:
    - Front-ends: Eagle, FEM, Simceiver
    - Multicore supported: yes
  - GNSS/SBAS signals support:
    - GPS: L1CA, L2C
    - BeiDou B1, B2
    - GLONASS: G1, G2, G3
    - Galileo: E1
    - IRNSS: L5, S
    - QZSS: L1CA
    - SBAS
  - Features:
    - Acquisition: yes
    - Tracking: yes
    - Generating pseudo-range observable: yes
    - Generating carrier-phase observable: yes
    - Decoding navigation data: yes
    - Position estimation: yes
    - Maximum number of real-time channels : 60 (5 correlators per channel)
    - Application programming interface: yes
    - Dual antenna support: yes, for FEM front end
    - Multi-correlator: yes
    - Sample data recording: yes
- SoftGNSS v3.0 (also known as SoftGPS)
  - General information:
    - Publication: https://www.springer.com/birkhauser/engineering/book/978-0-8176-4390-4
    - Source code: included with the book
    - Software licence: GPL v2
    - Non real-time (post-processing) GNSS software receiver
  - Development:
    - Programming language: MATLAB
    - User interface (none, CLI, GUI): CLI and GUI
    - Number of developers: 4 (along the project)
    - Under active development (as-of date): public version - no, non-public versions - yes (2013-Sep-30)
  - Hardware support:
    - Front-ends: SiGe GN3S Sampler v1 (in the original SDR and driver release). Signal records originating from other Sampler versions or other front-ends require configuration changes and in some cases also minor code changes.
    - Host computer special hardware supported: no
    - Multicore supported?: no
  - GNSS/SBAS signals support (separate version for each band of each GNSS):
    - GPS: L1CA
  - Features:
    - Acquisition: yes
    - Tracking: yes
    - Generating pseudo-range observable: yes
    - Generating carrier-phase observable: no
    - Decoding navigation data: yes
    - Position estimation: yes
- GNSS-SDR, An open source GNSS Software Defined Receiver
  - General information:
    - Software licence: GPL v3
  - Development:
    - Programming language: C++
    - User interface (none, CLI, GUI): CLI.
    - Number of developers: 26 (along the project)
    - Under active development (as-of date): yes (2021-Jan-08)
    - Creator/sponsor organization: Centre Tecnològic de Telecomunicacions de Catalunya
    - Latest release (version and date): 0.0.14 (as Jan 2021)
    - First release (version and date): 2011-Mar-11 first svn commit
  - Hardware support:
    - Front-ends: UHD-compatible (USRP family), OsmoSDR-compatible (RTL2832-based USB dongles, bladeRF, HackRF One), SiGe GN3S Sampler v2, AD-FMCOMMS2-EBZ
    - Host computer special hardware supported: SIMD (via VOLK and VOLK_GNSSSDR), CUDA
    - Multicore supported?: Yes
  - GNSS/SBAS signals support:
    - GPS: L1CA, L2C, L5
    - GLONASS: L1SP, L2SP
    - Galileo: E1b, E1c, E5a
    - BeiDou: B1I, B3I
    - SBAS: EGNOS
  - Features:
    - Acquisition: yes (several algorithms)
    - Tracking: yes (several algorithms)
    - Generating pseudo-range observable: yes
    - Generating carrier-phase observable: yes
    - Decoding navigation data: yes
    - Position estimation: yes
    - Maximum number of real-time channels demonstrated: > 100
    - Output formats: RINEX, KML, GPX, GeoJSON, NMEA, RTCM, intermediate results stored in binary .mat files readable from MATLAB and Octave, and from Python via h5py.
- GRID, Generalized Radionavigation Interfusion Device
  - General information:
    - Software licence: Commercial
    - Publication: Software-Defined GNSS is Ready for Launch
    - Contact: Radionavigation Laboratory, Locus Lock
  - Development:
    - Programming language: C++
    - Platforms: Linux, Windows, MacOS
    - User interface (none, CLI, GUI): CLI.
    - Number of developers: 15 (along the project)
    - Under active development (as-of date): yes (2023-Apr-28)
    - Creator/sponsor organization: University of Texas at Austin
    - Latest release (version and date): 2022 annual release
    - First release (version and date): 2008-Jul-01
  - Hardware support:
    - Front-ends: Several and, practically speaking, any.
    - Host computer special hardware supported: Intel SIMD (SSE2 through AVX-512), ARM NEON (64-bit and 128-bit)
    - Multicore supported?: Yes
  - GNSS/SBAS signals support:
    - GPS: L1CA, L2C, L5
    - Galileo: E1b, E1c, E5a
    - QZSS: L1CA
    - SBAS: WAAS L1
  - Features:
    - Acquisition: yes (several algorithms)
    - Tracking: yes (several algorithms)
    - Generating pseudo-range observable: yes
    - Generating carrier-phase observable: yes
    - Decoding navigation data: yes
    - Position estimation: yes
    - Multiple antennas: yes
    - Real-time Kinematic: yes, GRID can function as an RTK-base station or rover with integrated network support, RTK estimation when integrated with PpEngine (available through separate license)
    - Differential corrections: yes, CNAV and SBAS
    - Maximum number of real-time channels: Hardware-dependent, 30 on a Raspberry Pi 1, >100 on most desktop computers.
    - Output formats: RINEX, KML, MATLAB .mat files, CSV, proprietary GBX (GRID binary exchange) format.
    - Current applications: experimental FOTON receiver, several GNSS-RO commercial applications, commercial LEO satellite on-board navigation, RTK-based rocket navigation (launch-to-orbit), RTK-based vehicle navigation in urban environments, RTK-based drone, several fixed reference stations, signal abnormality monitoring
