= EPNS =

EPNS or EPNs may refer to:

- Electroplated nickel silver
- English Place-Name Society
- European Paediatric Neurology Society, an international organization devoted to paediatric neurology
- EPNs - Entomopathogenic nematodes

== See also ==
- EPN (disambiguation)
