= Sea level =

Geographical reference point from which various heights are measured

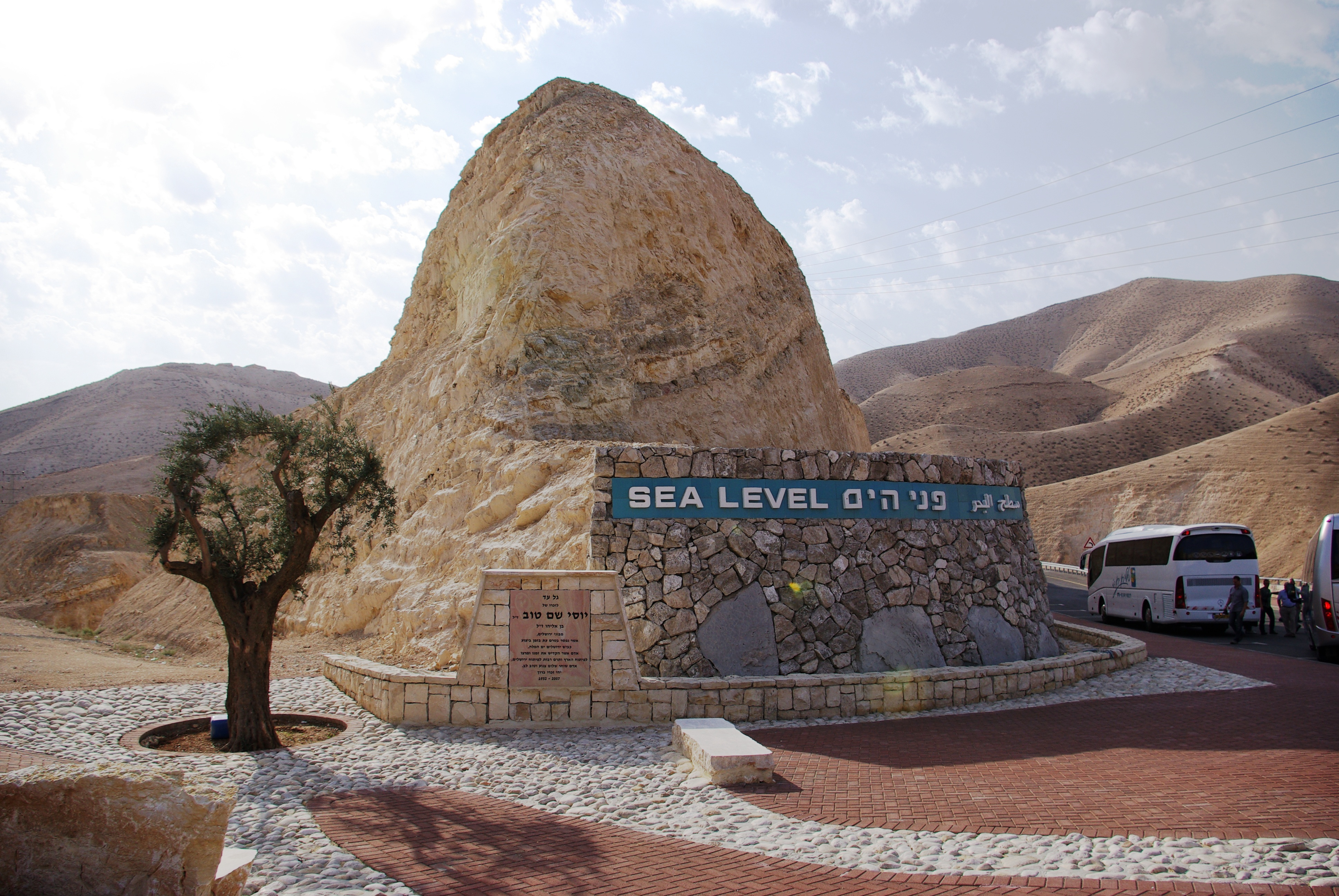
This marker indicating sea level is situated between Jerusalem and the Dead Sea.

Mean sea level (MSL, often shortened to sea level) is an average surface level of one or more among Earth's coastal bodies of water from which heights such as elevation may be measured. The global MSL is a type of vertical datum – a standardised geodetic datum – that is used, for example, as a chart datum in cartography and marine navigation, or, in aviation, as the standard sea level at which atmospheric pressure is measured to calibrate altitude and, consequently, aircraft flight levels. A common and relatively straightforward mean sea-level standard is instead a long-term average of tide gauge readings at a particular reference location.

The term above sea level generally refers to the height above mean sea level (AMSL). The term APSL means above present sea level, comparing sea levels in the past with the level today.

Earth's radius at sea level is 6,378.137 km (3,963.191 mi) at the equator. It is 6,356.752 km (3,949.903 mi) at the poles and 6,371.001 km (3,958.756 mi) on average. This flattened spheroid, combined with local gravity anomalies, defines the geoid of the Earth, which approximates the local mean sea level for locations in the open ocean. The geoid includes a significant depression in the Indian Ocean, whose surface dips as much as 106 m (348 ft) below the global mean sea level (excluding minor effects such as tides and currents). It was found in 2026 that sea levels estimated using the geoid used in 90% of published work were about 25cm lower than measured values on average, hence underestimating the effect of sea level rise.

== Measurement ==
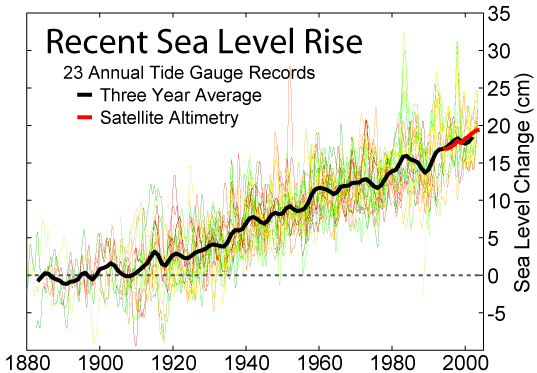
Sea level measurements from 23 long tide gauge records in geologically stable environments show a rise of around 200 millimetres (7.9 in) during the 20th century (2 mm/year).

Precise determination of a "mean sea level" is difficult because of the many factors that affect sea level. Instantaneous sea level varies substantially on several scales of time and space. This is because the sea is in constant motion, affected by the tides, tsunamis, wind, atmospheric pressure, local gravitational differences, temperature, salinity, and so forth. The mean sea level at a particular location may be calculated over an extended time period and used as a datum. For example, hourly measurements may be averaged over a full Metonic 19-year lunar cycle to determine the mean sea level at an official tide gauge.

Still-water level or still-water sea level (SWL) is the level of the sea with motions such as wind waves averaged out. Then MSL implies the SWL further averaged over a period of time such that changes due to, e.g., the tides, also have zero mean. Global MSL refers to a spatial average over the entire ocean area, typically using large sets of tide gauges and/or satellite measurements.

One often measures the values of MSL with respect to the land; hence a change in relative MSL or (relative sea level) can result from a real change in sea level, or from a change in the height of the land on which the tide gauge operates, or both. In the UK, the ordnance datum (the 0 metres height on UK maps) is the mean sea level measured at Newlyn in Cornwall between 1915 and 1921. Before 1921, the vertical datum was MSL at the Victoria Dock, Liverpool. Since the times of the Russian Empire, in Russia and its other former parts, now independent states, the sea level is measured from the zero level of Kronstadt Sea-Gauge. In Hong Kong, "mPD" is a surveying term meaning "metres above Principal Datum" and refers to height of 0.146 m (5.7 in) above chart datum and 1.304 m (4 ft 3.3 in) below the average sea level. In France, the Marégraphe in Marseille measures continuously the sea level since 1883 and offers the longest collated data about the sea level. It is used for a part of continental Europe and the main part of Africa as the official sea level. Spain uses the reference to measure heights below or above sea level at Alicante, while the European Vertical Reference System is calibrated to the Amsterdam Peil elevation, which dates back to the 1690s.

Satellite altimeters have been making precise measurements of sea level since the launch of TOPEX/Poseidon in 1992. A joint mission of NASA and CNES, TOPEX/Poseidon was followed by Jason-1 in 2001 and the Ocean Surface Topography Mission on the Jason-2 satellite in 2008.

=== Height above mean sea level ===
Height above mean sea level (AMSL) is the elevation (on the ground) or altitude (in the air) of an object, relative to a reference datum for mean sea level (MSL). It is also used in aviation, where some heights are recorded and reported with respect to mean sea level (contrast with flight level), and in the atmospheric sciences, and in land surveying. An alternative is to base height measurements on a reference ellipsoid approximating the entire Earth, which is what systems such as GPS do. In aviation, the reference ellipsoid known as WGS84 is increasingly used to define heights; however, differences up to 100 metres (328 feet) exist between this ellipsoid height and local mean sea level. Another alternative is to use a geoid-based vertical datum such as NAVD88 and the global EGM96 (part of WGS84). Details vary in different countries.

When referring to geographic features such as mountains, on a topographic map variations in elevation are shown by contour lines. A mountain's highest point or summit is typically illustrated with the AMSL height in metres, feet or both. In unusual cases where a land location is below sea level, such as Death Valley, California, the elevation AMSL is negative.

==== Difficulties in use ====
1. Ocean; 2. Reference ellipsoid; 3. Local plumb line; 4. Continent; 5. Geoid

It is often necessary to compare the local height of the mean sea surface with a "level" reference surface, or geodetic datum, called the geoid. In the absence of external forces, the local mean sea level would coincide with this geoid surface, being an equipotential surface of the Earth's gravitational field which, in itself, does not conform to a simple sphere or ellipsoid and exhibits gravity anomalies such as those measured by NASA's GRACE satellites. In reality, the geoid surface is not directly observed, even as a long-term average, due to ocean currents, air pressure variations, temperature and salinity variations, etc. The location-dependent but time-persistent separation between local mean sea level and the geoid is referred to as (mean) ocean surface topography. It varies globally in a typical range of ±1 m (3 ft).

Work published in 2026 analysed 385 peer-reviewed scientific papers published since 2009 and compared the difference between calculations using commonly assumed coastal sea levels using global geoid models with actual measurements. It was found that over 90% of studies used land elevation measurements referenced against global geoid models instead of local direct measurements. This underestimated levels by an average of 24-27cm, with some discrepancies reaching 550-760cm, a discrepancy described as an "interdisciplinary blind spot". The effect of this underestimation is that for a sea level rise of 1m, 37% more coastal areas than previously estimated will fall below sea level, affecting up to 132 million people.

== Dry land ==
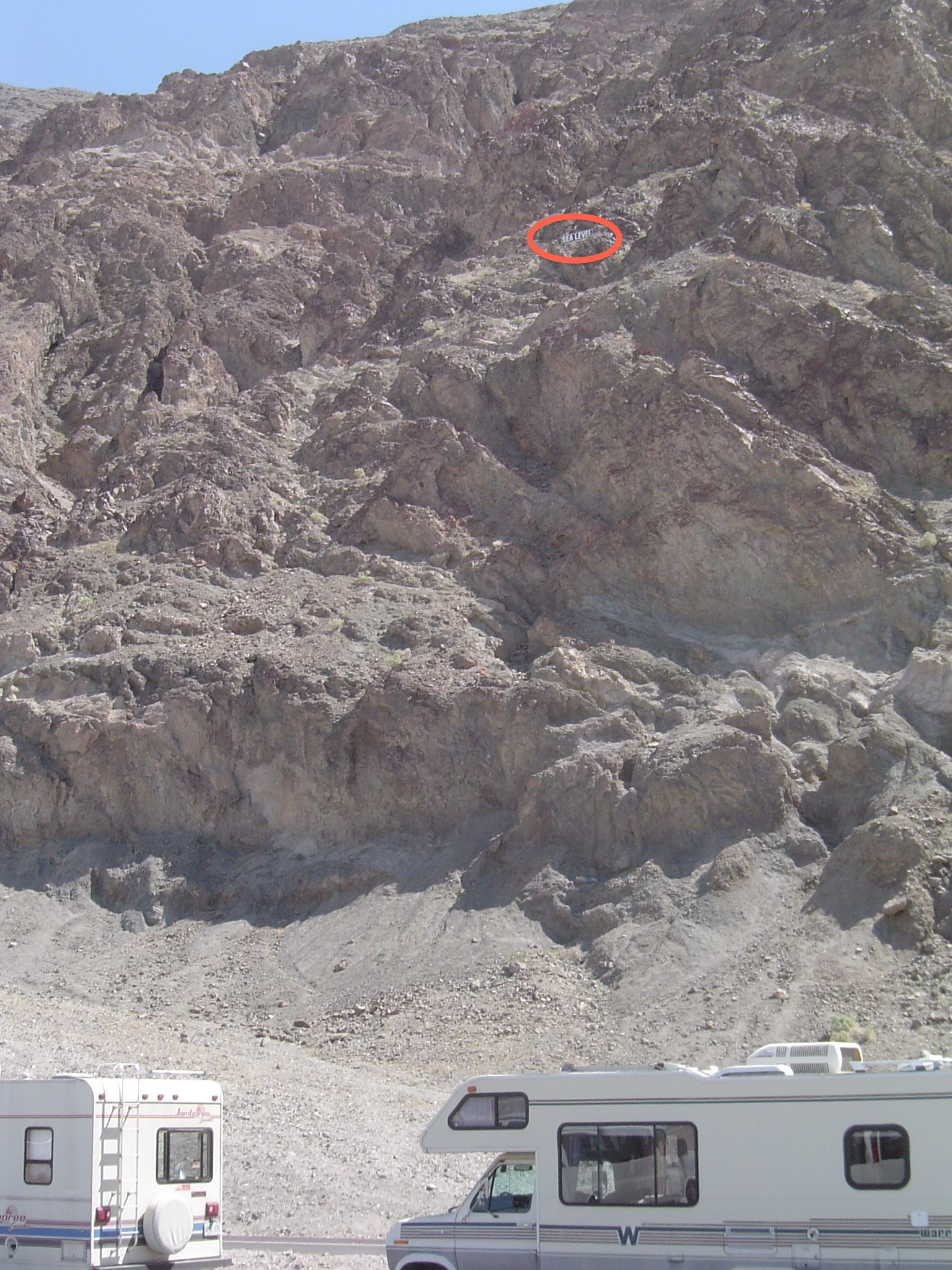
Sea level sign seen on cliff (circled in red) at Badwater Basin, Death Valley National Park

Several terms are used to describe the changing relationships between sea level and dry land.

- "relative" means change relative to a fixed point in the sediment pile.
- "eustatic" refers to global changes in sea level relative to a fixed point, such as the centre of the earth, for example as a result of melting ice-caps.
- "steric" refers to global changes in sea level due to thermal expansion and salinity variations.
- "isostatic" refers to changes in the level of the land relative to a fixed point in the earth, possibly due to thermal buoyancy or tectonic effects, disregarding changes in the volume of water in the oceans.

The melting of glaciers at the end of ice ages results in isostatic post-glacial rebound, when land rises after the weight of ice is removed. Conversely, older volcanic islands experience relative sea level rise, due to isostatic subsidence from the weight of cooling volcanos. The subsidence of land due to the withdrawal of groundwater is another isostatic cause of relative sea level rise.

On planets that lack a liquid ocean, planetologists can calculate a "mean altitude" by averaging the heights of all points on the surface. This altitude, sometimes referred to as a "sea level" or zero-level elevation, serves equivalently as a reference for the height of planetary features.

== Change ==
=== Local and eustatic ===
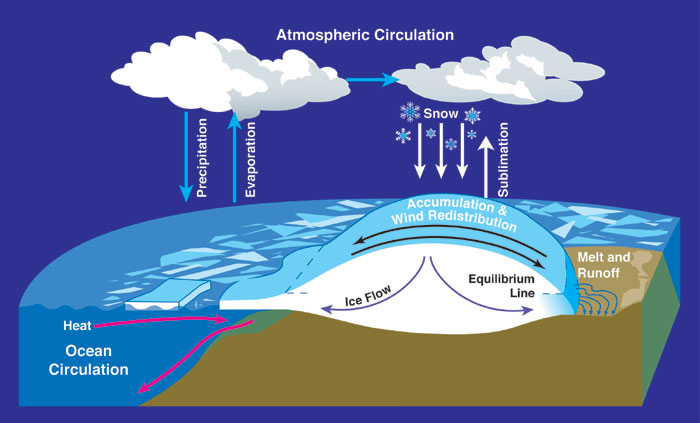
Water cycles between ocean, atmosphere and glaciers

Local mean sea level (LMSL) is defined as the height of the sea with respect to a land benchmark, averaged over a period of time long enough that fluctuations caused by waves and tides are smoothed out, typically a year or more. One must adjust perceived changes in LMSL to account for vertical movements of the land, which can occur at rates similar to sea level changes (millimetres per year).

Some land movements occur because of isostatic adjustment to the melting of ice sheets at the end of the last ice age. The weight of the ice sheet depresses the underlying land, and when the ice melts away the land slowly rebounds. Changes in ground-based ice volume also affect local and regional sea levels by the readjustment of the geoid and true polar wander. Atmospheric pressure, ocean currents and local ocean temperature changes can affect LMSL as well.

Eustatic sea level change (global as opposed to local change) is due to change in either the volume of water in the world's oceans or the volume of the oceanic basins. Two major mechanisms are currently causing eustatic sea level rise. First, shrinking land ice, such as mountain glaciers and polar ice sheets, is releasing water into the oceans. Second, as ocean temperatures rise, the warmer water expands.

=== Short-term and periodic changes ===
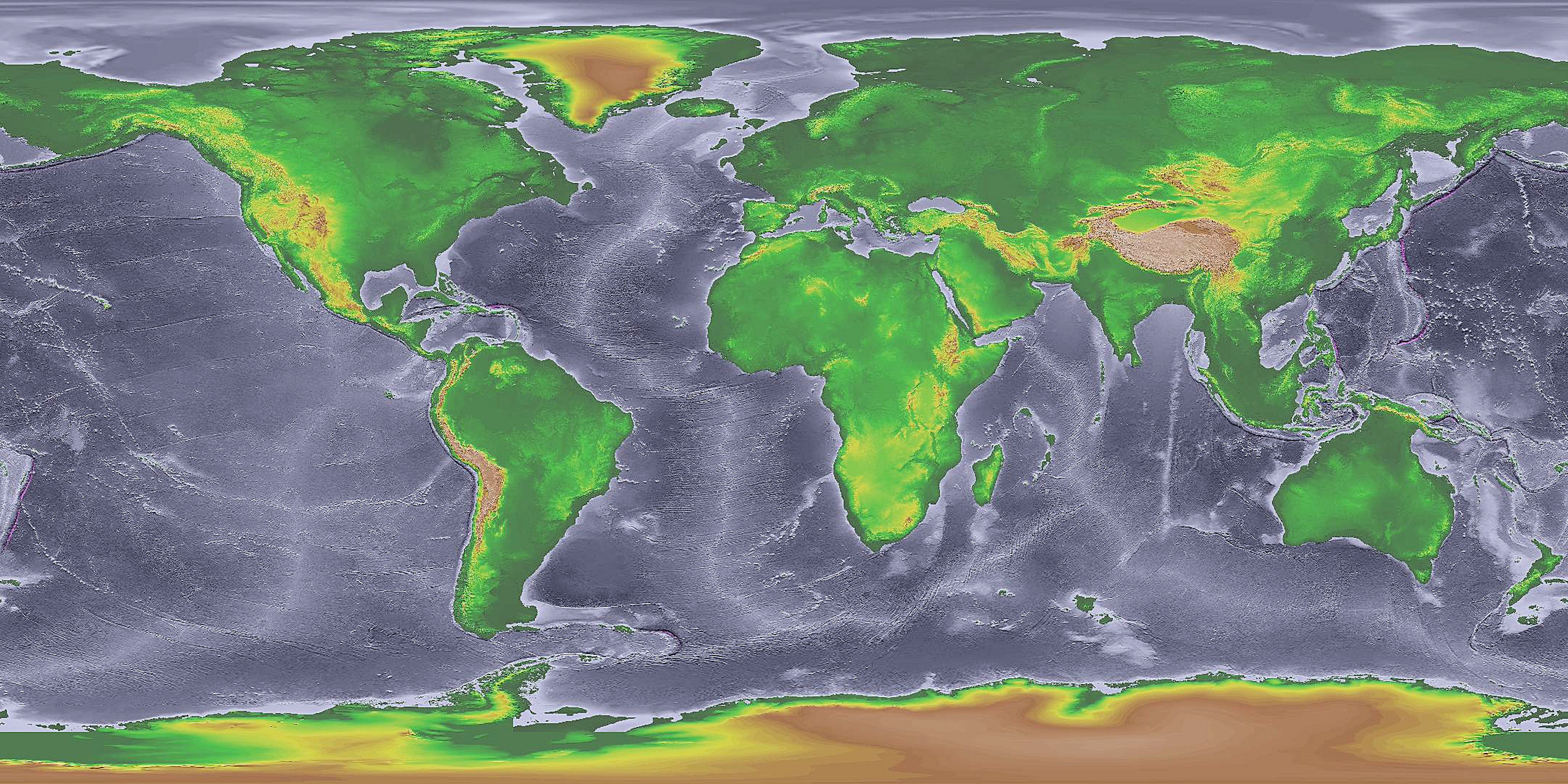
The Last Glacial Period caused a much lower global sea level.

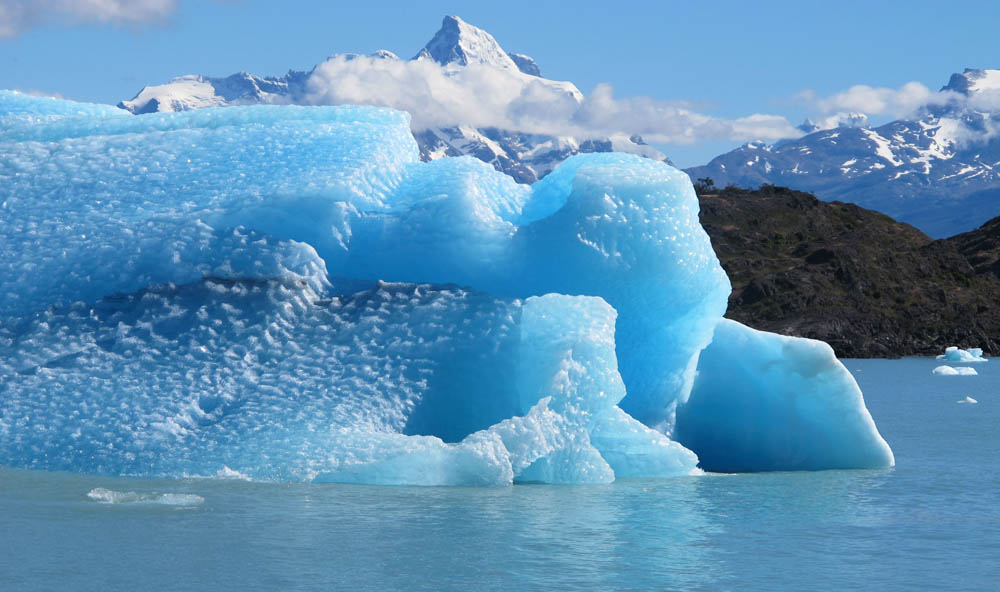
Warming temperatures and melting glaciers are currently raising the sea level.

Many factors can produce short-term changes in sea level, typically within a few metres, in timeframes ranging from minutes to months:

Periodic sea level changes
Diurnal and semidiurnal astronomical tides	12–24 h P	0.1–10+ m
Long-period tides	2-week to 1-year P	<0.1 m
Pole tides (Chandler wobble)	14-month P	5 mm
Meteorological and oceanographic fluctuations
Atmospheric pressure	Hours to months	−0.7 to 1.3 m
Winds (storm surges)	1–5 days	Up to 5 m
Evaporation and precipitation (may also follow long-term pattern)	Days to weeks	<0.1m
Ocean surface topography (changes in water density and currents)	Days to weeks	Up to 1 m
El Niño/southern oscillation	6 mo every 5–10 yr	Up to 0.6 m
Seasonal variations
Seasonal water balance among oceans (Atlantic, Pacific, Indian)	6 months
Seasonal variations in slope of water surface	6 months
River runoff/floods	2 months	1 m
Seasonal water density changes (temperature and salinity)	6 months	0.2 m
Seiches
Seiches (standing waves)	Minutes to hours	Up to 2 m
Earthquakes
Tsunamis (catastrophic long-period waves)	Hours	0.1–10+ m
Abrupt change in land level	Minutes	Up to 10 m

=== Recent changes ===
The sea level has generally been rising since the end of the Last Glacial Maximum, which was around 20,000 years ago. Between 1901 and 2018, the global average sea level rose by 15–25 cm (6–10 in), with an increase of 2.3 mm (0.091 in) per year since the 1970s. This was faster than the sea level had ever risen over at least the past 3,000 years. The rate accelerated to 4.62 mm (0.182 in)/yr for the decade 2013–2022. Climate change due to human activities is the main cause of this persistent acceleration. Between 1993 and 2018, melting ice sheets and glaciers accounted for 44% of sea level rise, with another 42% resulting from thermal expansion of water.

Sea level rise lags behind changes in the Earth's temperature by decades, and sea level rise will therefore continue to accelerate between now and 2050 in response to warming that has already happened. What happens after that depends on future human greenhouse gas emissions. If there are very deep cuts in emissions, sea level rise would slow down between 2050 and 2100. It could then rise by between 30 cm (1 ft) and 1.0 m (3 1/3 ft) between the early 2020s and 2100, or by approximately 60 cm (2 ft) to 130 cm (4 1/2 ft) from the 19th century to 2100. With high emissions it would instead accelerate further, and could rise by 50 cm (1.6 ft) or even by 1.9 m (6.2 ft) by 2100. In the long run, sea level rise would amount to 2–3 m (7–10 ft) over the next 2000 years if warming stays to its current 1.5 °C (2.7 °F) over the pre-industrial past. It would be 19–22 metres (62–72 ft) if warming peaks at 5 °C (9.0 °F). The expected increase in flood hazard potential is often exceedingly large even for modest sea-level rise scenarios, ranging from 10 to 1000 for rises of 0.5 m or less.

Rising seas affect every coastal population on Earth. This can be through flooding, higher storm surges, king tides, and increased vulnerability to tsunamis. There are many knock-on effects. They lead to loss of coastal ecosystems such as mangrove swamps. There may be a reduction in crop yields because of increasing salt levels in irrigation water. Damage to ports disrupts sea trade. The sea level rise projected by 2050 will expose places currently inhabited by tens of millions of people to annual flooding. Without a sharp reduction in greenhouse gas emissions, this may increase to hundreds of millions in the latter decades of the century.

Local factors such as tidal range or land subsidence will greatly affect the severity of impacts. For instance, sea level rise in the United States is likely to be two to three times greater than the global average by the end of the century. Yet, of the twenty countries with the greatest exposure to sea level rise, twelve are in Asia, including Indonesia, Bangladesh and the Philippines. The resilience and adaptive capacity of ecosystems and countries also varies, which will result in more or less pronounced impacts. The greatest impact on human populations in the near term will occur in low-lying Caribbean and Pacific islands including atolls. Sea level rise will make many of them uninhabitable later this century.

Societies can adapt to sea level rise in multiple ways. Managed retreat, accommodating coastal change, or protecting against sea level rise through hard-construction practices such as seawalls are hard approaches. There are also soft approaches such as dune rehabilitation and beach nourishment. Sometimes these adaptation strategies go hand in hand. At other times choices must be made among different strategies. Poorer nations may also struggle to implement the same approaches to adapt to sea level rise as richer states.

Sea level rise has been studied through an environmental justice framework, as its impacts are not evenly distributed across populations. Research suggests that socially and economically vulnerable communities are often more at risk to coastal flooding and have fewer resources for adaptation or relocation.

Sea level rise can also contribute to the displacement or relocation of coastal and island populations, including some Indigenous communities whose cultural practices are closely connected to ancestral lands. Relocation efforts may involve challenges related to maintaining community organization and farming practices as well.

== Aviation ==
Pilots can estimate height above sea level with an altimeter set to a defined barometric pressure. Generally, the pressure used to set the altimeter is the barometric pressure that would exist at MSL in the region being flown over. This pressure is referred to as either QNH or "altimeter" and is transmitted to the pilot by radio from air traffic control (ATC) or an automatic terminal information service (ATIS). Since the terrain elevation is also referenced to MSL, the pilot can estimate height above ground by subtracting the terrain altitude from the altimeter reading. Aviation charts are divided into boxes and the maximum terrain altitude from MSL in each box is clearly indicated. Once above the transition altitude, the altimeter is set to the international standard atmosphere (ISA) pressure at MSL which is 1013.25 hPa or 29.92 inHg.

== See also ==
- Annual cycle of sea level height
- Above ground level – Height measured with respect to the underlying ground surface
- Amsterdam Ordnance Datum, also known as Normaal Amsterdams Peil – Vertical datum
- Before Present – Time scale used in scientific disciplines
- Chart datum – Level of water from which depths displayed on a nautical chart are measured
- Extreme points of Earth
- Geopotential height – Type of altitude above mean sea level
- Height above average terrain – Height based on large area surrounding object; often used in U.S. for antenna towers
- List of places on land with elevations below sea level
- Meltwater pulse 1A – Period of rapid post-glacial sea level rise
- Metres above the Adriatic – Vertical datum used in parts of Europe
- Normal height – Altitude above quasigeoid or mean sea level
- Normalhöhennull – Vertical datum used in Germany
- Normalnull – Outdated official vertical datum used in Germany
- North West Shelf Operational Oceanographic System – Oceanography facility
- Ordnance datum – Vertical datum used as the basis for deriving altitudes on maps (UK and Ireland)
- Orthometric height – Altitude above geoid or mean sea level
- Raised beach, also known as Marine terrace – Emergent coastal landform
- Regional Reference Frame Sub-Commission for Europe
- Sea level drop – Drop relative to land rebounding from weight of ice
- Sea level equation – Rise of land masses after glacial period
- World Geodetic System – Geodetic reference system
