= EUREF Permanent Network =

EPN
- EUREF Permanent Network
- Founded: 1996
- Headquarters: Brussels, Belgium
- Members: more than 30 countries
- Key people: C. Bruyninx, Central Bureau
- Affiliations: EUREF, International Association of Geodesy
- Website: epncb.oma.be

EUREF Permanent Network (EPN) is a European network of more than 300 continuously operating GNSS reference stations with precisely known coordinates referenced to the ETRS89. The EPN is the key instrument in the maintenance of ETRS89 geodetic datum. The EPN stations collect continuously the observation data from high accuracy multi-GNSS receivers. The data is processed in a distributed way in a few data processing centres. The EPN is created and maintained by a voluntary agreement of about 100 European agencies and universities. THE EPN activities are coordinated by EUREF.

== Structure ==
The EPN consists of the following components:

- Tracking Stations include GNSS tracking receivers and antennae on suitable geodetic markers.
- Operational Centres perform data validation, conversion of raw data to the RINEX format, data compression, and upload to Local Data Centres.
- Local Data Centres store the data of Tracking Stations and disseminate them via the Internet.
- Local Analysis Centres process a subnetwork of EPN stations and deliver weekly subnetwork solutions to Combination Centres.
- Combination Centres combine subnetwork solutions into one official EPN solution, which is weekly sent to the IGS for the integration in the global GNSS network solution.
- Central Bureau manages day-to-day the activities of EPN. It is located at the Royal Observatory of Belgium in Brussels.

== Data and products ==
EPN data are raw multi-GNSS pseudorange and phase observations, broadcast ephemerides, and supporting types of raw data (such as meteorological) as they are gathered by the Tracking Stations. The EPN data is available in daily, hourly, 15-min RINEX-formatted files, and for many stations as a real-time data stream via NTRIP.

EPN products include

- best-known coordinates of the Tracking Stations in both ETRS89 and ITRS geodetic datums;
- time series of the coordinates of the Tracking Stations;
- tropospheric zenith path delays at all the Tracking Stations.
