= CCGS Leonard J. Cowley =

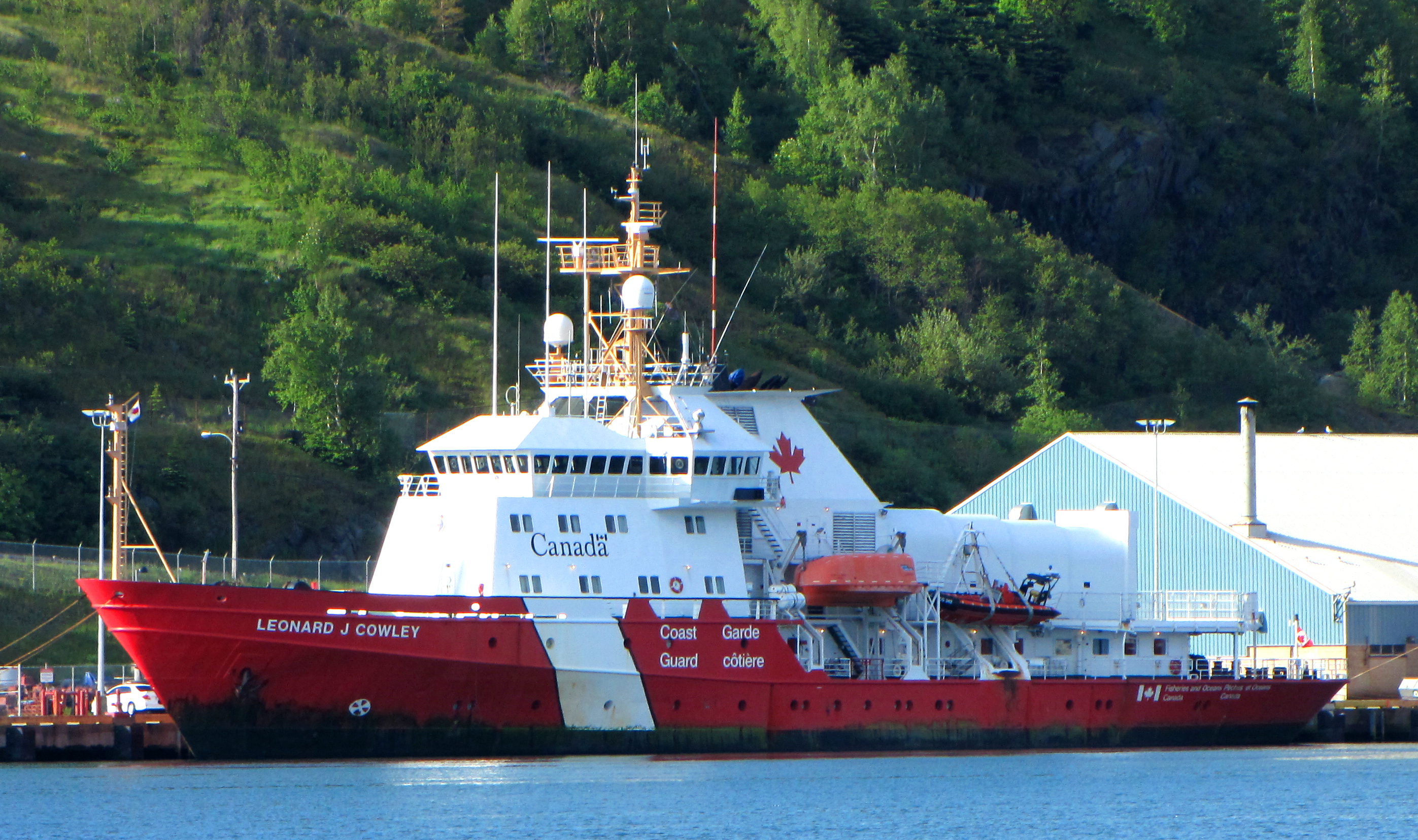
- CCGS Leonard J. Cowley in St. John's Harbour, 2010

History

Canada
- Name: Leonard J. Cowley
- Namesake: Len Cowley
- Operator: Canadian Coast Guard
- Builder: West Coast Manly Shipyards Limited, Vancouver, British Columbia
- Yard number: 590
- Launched: November 1984
- Completed: June 1985
- Commissioned: 1984
- Refit: 1996
- Home port: CCG Base St. John's, Newfoundland and Labrador
- Identification: IMO number: 8320494
- Status: Ship in active service

General characteristics
- Type: Fisheries patrol vessel
- Tonnage: 2,188 GT; 655 NT
- Displacement: 2,080 long tons (2,110 t) full load
- Length: 72 m (236 ft 3 in)
- Beam: 14.2 m (46 ft 7 in)
- Draught: 4.5 m (14 ft 9 in)
- Installed power: 2 × Polar Nohab F312V geared diesels; 3,160 kW (4,240 hp)
- Propulsion: 1 × controllable-pitch propeller
- Speed: 15 knots (28 km/h; 17 mph)
- Range: 10,000 nmi (19,000 km; 12,000 mi) at 12 knots (22 km/h)
- Endurance: 35 days
- Complement: 19
- Aircraft carried: 1 × light helicopter
- Aviation facilities: Hangar and flight deck

CCGS Leonard J. Cowley (Note: CCGS stands for Canadian Coast Guard Ship) is an ice-strengthened fisheries patrol vessel of the Canadian Coast Guard. The ship entered service in 1984 and is still currently in service. During the Turbot War, the patrol vessel took part in the detainment of the Spanish fishing vessel Estai. Leonard J. Cowley's home port is St. John's, Newfoundland and Labrador.

== Design and description ==
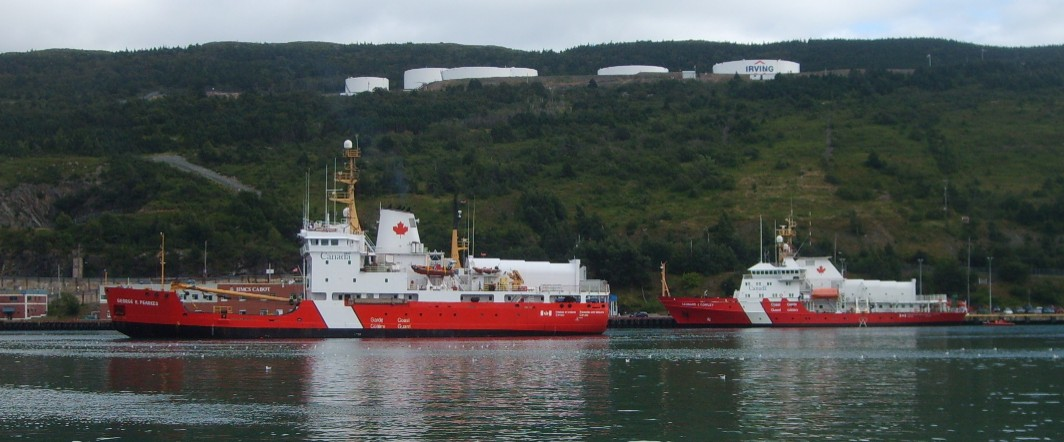
CCGS Leonard J. Cowley (right) in harbour with CCGS George R. Pearkes

Leonard J. Cowley is similar in design to CCGS John P. Tully. Leonard J. Cowley is 72 m (236 ft 3 in) long overall with a beam of 14.2 m (46 ft 7 in) and a draught of 4.5 m (14 ft 9 in). The ship has a full load displacement of 2,080 long tons (2,110 t) with a 2,188 gross tonnage (GT) and a 655 net tonnage (NT). The ship is propelled by one controllable-pitch propeller driven by two Polar Nohab F312V geared diesel engines creating 3,160 kW (4,240 hp). This gives the ship a maximum speed of 15 knots (28 km/h). The ship also carries one Caterpillar 3306 emergency generator. The vessel carries 420.00 m^{3} (92,390 imp gal) of diesel fuel giving the ship a range of 10,000 nmi (19,000 km) at 12 knots (22 km/h) and allowing Leonard J. Cowley to stay at sea for up to 35 days.

The vessel is ice-strengthened, being certified as Type B. Leonard J. Cowley has a flight deck capable of operating a light helicopter of the MBB Bo 105 or Bell 206L types and a retractable hangar. There is a helicopter strobe beacon and VHF homing transmitter for navigation, and an agent-and-foam system for fire fighting on the helicopter deck. The ship is equipped with an autopilot including adaptive steering gear, a shilling rudder and a 250-horsepower (190 kW) bow thruster for maneuvering. Leonard J. Cowley has a computer system which identifies exact locations of other vessels, and two radars, one of which has a feed to the electronic charting unit. The vessel also has a Differential Global Positioning System (DGPS) feed and a Global Marine Distress Safety System.

The fisheries patrol vessel has a complement of 19, with 9 officers and 11 crew and 20 additional berths. Leonard J. Cowley monitors fishing activities to fulfill Canada's commitment to the Northwest Atlantic Fisheries Organization. Due to the nature of the vessel's duties in fisheries enforcement, Leonard J. Cowley often carries an armed boarding team. While Leonard J. Cowley's primary task is fisheries patrol, the vessel also carries out search and rescue operations.

== Service ==
The ship was constructed by West Coast Manly Shipyard in Vancouver, British Columbia with the yard number 590. The vessel was launched in November 1984 and completed in June 1985. The vessel entered service with the Canadian Coast Guard in 1984. The ship was named for Len Cowley, a Newfoundland biologist who served with the Department of Fisheries and Oceans as assistant deputy minister. From 1974 to 1981, Len Cowley was a regional director general for Newfoundland. After being employed by the department for 22 years, Len Cowley died in 1982. The ship is registered in Ottawa, Ontario and homeported at St. John's, Newfoundland and Labrador.

On 11 August 1986, Leonard J. Cowley brought 155 Tamil refugees into St. John's after they had been set adrift in lifeboats from a smuggler's boat of the coast of Newfoundland. The Tamils were first rescued by Capt. Gus Dalton and the crew of the fishing vessel Atlantic Reaper before being transferred to Leonard J. Cowley. The rescue was later celebrated as a successful welcome and integration of a group of refugees and the Coast Guard ship was the centre of a 30th anniversary celebration of the incident in 2016.

At the height of the Turbot War in June 1994, a dispute between Canada and the European Union over fishing rights, Leonard J. Cowley was tasked with monitoring the European fishing fleet on the Grand Banks. During the arrest of the Spanish fishing vessel Estai for illegal fishing, Leonard J. Cowley was used as the command vessel during the operation and her crew were ordered to fire machine gun bursts across the bow of the Spanish vessel. The operation was successful and the nets from the Spanish fishing vessel were later used to vindicate Canada's actions in the affair.

On 10 January 1996 the merchant vessel Amphion was damaged in a storm 485 miles (781 km) southeast of St. John's. The ship began to take on water and requested assistance. Leonard J. Cowley was among the vessels dispatched to the scene, arriving on 11 January. The crew of Amphion were taken off and brought to the fisheries patrol vessel while the merchant vessel was brought to port by the tugboat Tignish Sea.

On 22 February 2009, the vessel was instrumental in rescuing the 22-person crew of the Spanish fishing vessel FV Monte Galineiro, which was burning and sinking off the coast of Newfoundland and Labrador.

Beginning in February 2015, Leonard J. Cowley underwent an $8.5 million refit performed by NEWDOCK St. John's Dockyard Limited in St. John's. This was announced by Gail Shea, Minister of Fisheries and Oceans, and Diane Finley, Minister of Public Works and Government Services on 18 February 2015. The refit lasted until October as part of the plan to renew the Coast Guard fleet.
