= Annual cycle of sea level height =

The annual cycle of sea level height (or seasonal cycle or annual harmonic) describes the variation of sea level that occurs with a period of one year. Historically, analysis of the annual cycle has been limited by locations with tide gauge records, i.e., coastlines and some islands in the deep ocean, and by sparse records in the Southern Hemisphere. Since 1992, satellite-based altimeters have provided near global coverage of sea level variability, allowing for a more thorough understanding of the annual cycle both in the deep ocean and in coastal margins.

== Tide Gauge Era ==
Prior to the introduction of satellite-based altimeters, sea level was measured by a network of tide gauges located along continental coastlines and some deep ocean islands. The first analysis of the annual cycle of sea level height on a global scale was done in 1955 by Pattullo et al. An update to this initial study was completed by Tsimplis and Woodworth in 1994 at the beginning of the satellite altimetry era. In general, amplitudes of the annual cycle are less than 150mm (6 inches) and are typically larger in the Northern Hemisphere than in the Southern Hemisphere. Annual amplitudes also vary within ocean basins and along stretches of coastline. On the European side of the North Atlantic Ocean annual amplitudes generally increase from south to north, in contrast with the American side where annual amplitudes generally decrease from south to north. Similarly, on the American side of the North Pacific Ocean annual amplitudes generally increase from south to north (with increased amplitudes in the north likely linked to meteorological forcing), while the western side of the Pacific generally sees annual amplitudes decrease with increasing latitude.

Determining the exact cause of the annual cycle is difficult as there are several factors that influence the amplitude and timing of the annual cycle along the coast including winds, water temperature and salinity, local bathymetry, coastal geometry, ocean currents, land movements, and river outflows. The largest amplitudes in the annual cycle are generally noted near areas with large river outflow such as along the Bay of Bengal, the Gulf of Bohai, the St. Lawrence River, and the Rio Uruguay.

== Satellite Altimetry Era ==
Beginning in 1992 with the TOPEX/Poseidon mission (and continuing with Jason-1 and Jason-2), satellite based radar altimetry has been utilized to measure sea level height, enabling sea level height variability in the open ocean to be analyzed for the first time. As a result, it has been shown that there are significant differences in the phase and amplitude of the annual cycle between the deep ocean and coastal waters (less than 200m). In general, large amplitudes of the annual cycle occur near the coast, except in the vicinity of strong western boundary currents. The difference between coastal areas and the deep ocean is suggested to be the result of several physical factors including local and remote atmospheric, oceanic, and terrestrial processes, sharp gradients in wind and moisture along land/sea boundaries, and land motions with an annual oscillatory component from tidal or atmospheric loading.

== See also ==
- Tide
- Tide gauge
- Sea level
