= Ionex =

Ionex may refer to:

- Ion-exchange resin, an anion exchange resin fiber used in the ion exchange process
- IONosphere-map EXchange format (IONEX), an extension of the RINEX standard designed specifically for the ionosphere
- Ionex, an electric vehicle brand created by Taiwanese manufacturer Kymco

== See also ==
- Ion exchange
