= EPN =

EPN may refer to:

- End Polio Now, the polio eradication campaign of Rotary International and the World Health Organization
- Economic Prosperity Network, a global alliance initiative of the first Trump administration
- EPN (insecticide)
- Effective perceived noise, a measure of aircraft noise
- Electronic Payments Network, an electronic clearing house
- Enrique Peña Nieto, President of Mexico 2012–2018
- Enterprise private network, an intranet in a large organisation
- Entomopathogenic nematode, thread worm that kills insects
- Epsin, a membrane protein
- Esplanade MRT station, Singapore (MRT station abbreviation)
- EUREF Permanent Network, a European GPS network
- National Polytechnic School (Ecuador) (Spanish: Escuela Politécnica Nacional), a university in Quito
