= CCGS George R. Pearkes =

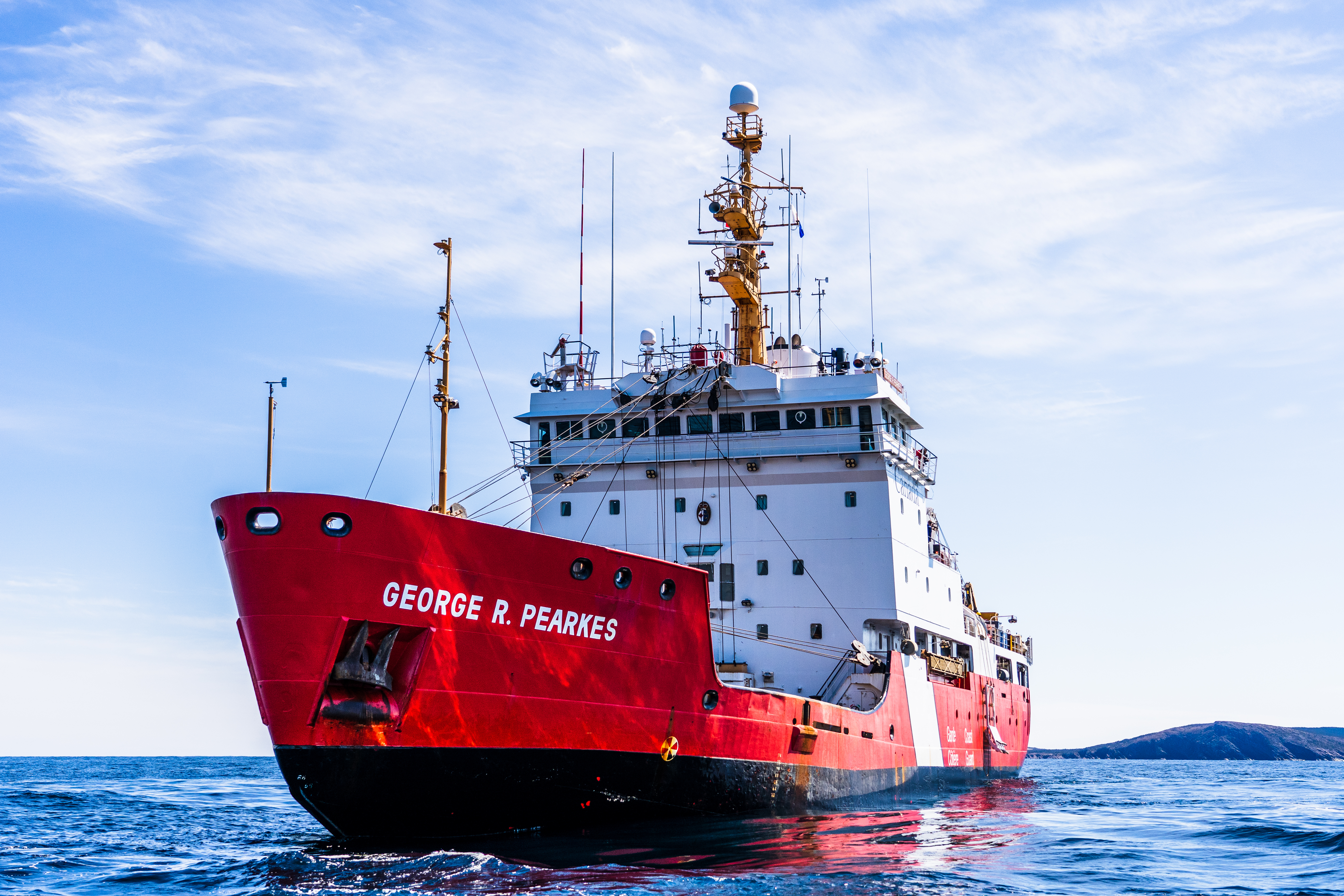
- CCGS George. R. Pearkes in May 2022

History

Canada
- Name: George R. Pearkes
- Namesake: George Pearkes
- Operator: Canadian Coast Guard
- Port of registry: Ottawa, Ontario
- Builder: Versatile Pacific Shipyards Ltd., North Vancouver
- Yard number: 555
- Launched: 30 November 1985
- Commissioned: 17 April 1986
- In service: 1986–present
- Home port: CCG Base St. John's (Newfoundland and Labrador Region)
- Identification: CGCX; IMO number: 8320444
- Status: in active service

General characteristics
- Class & type: Martha L. Black-class light icebreaker and buoy tender
- Tonnage: 3,809.1 GT; 1,517.3 NT
- Displacement: 4,662 long tons (4,737 t) full load
- Length: 83 m (272 ft 4 in)
- Beam: 16.2 m (53 ft 2 in)
- Draught: 6 m (19 ft 8 in)
- Ice class: CASPPR Arctic Class 2
- Propulsion: Diesel electric – 3 Alco 251F-16V
- Speed: 15 knots (28 km/h)
- Range: 14,500 nmi (26,900 km) at 11 knots (20 km/h)
- Endurance: 150 days
- Boats & landing craft carried: 1 × self-propelled barge
- Complement: 25
- Sensors & processing systems: 1 × Racal Decca Bridgemaster navigational radar (I band)
- Aircraft carried: Originally 1 × MBB Bo 105 or Bell 206L helicopter, currently 1 × Bell 429 GlobalRanger or Bell 412EPI
- Aviation facilities: Hangar and flight deck

CCGS George R. Pearkes (Note: CCGS stands for Canadian Coast Guard Ship) is a Martha L. Black-class light icebreaker and buoy support vessel in the Canadian Coast Guard. Named for Victoria Cross-winner George Pearkes, the ship entered service in 1986. Initially assigned to Pacific region, the vessel transferred to the Quebec region. George R. Pearkes was assigned to her current deployment, the Newfoundland and Labrador region in 2004.

== Design and description ==
George R. Pearkes displaces 4,662 long tons (4,737 t) fully loaded with a 3,809.1 gross tonnage (GT) and a 1,517.3 net tonnage (NT). The ship is 83.0 metres (272 ft 4 in) long overall with a beam of 16.2 metres (53 ft 2 in) and a draught of 5.8 metres (19 ft 0 in).

The vessel is powered by is propelled by two fixed-pitch propellers and bow thrusters powered by three Alco 251F diesel-electric engines creating 8,847 horsepower (6,597 kW) and three Canadian GE generators producing 6 megawatts of AC power driving two Canadian GE motors creating 7,040 horsepower (5,250 kW). The ship is also equipped with one Caterpillar 3306 emergency generator. This gives the ship a maximum speed of 15 knots (28 km/h). Capable of carrying 925 long tons (940 t) of diesel fuel, George R. Pearkes has a maximum range of 14,500 nautical miles (26,900 km) at a cruising speed of 11 knots (20 km/h) and can stay at sea for up to 150 days. The ship is certified as Arctic Class 2.

The icebreaker is equipped with one Racal Decca Bridgemaster navigational radar operating on the I band. The vessel is equipped with a crane capable of lifting up to 20 long tons (20 t) and a 980 m^{3} (35,000 cu ft) cargo hold. The ship carries a self-propelled barge. George R. Pearkes has a flight deck and hangar which originally housed light helicopters of the MBB Bo 105 or Bell 206L types, but in the 2010s, the Bell 429 GlobalRanger and Bell 412EPI were acquired by the Canadian Coast Guard to replace the older helicopters. The ship has a complement of 25, with 10 officers and 15 crew. George R. Pearkes has 26 additional berths.

== Service history ==
The ship was constructed by Versatile Pacific Shipyards Limited at their yard in North Vancouver, British Columbia with the yard number 555. George R. Pearkes was launched on 30 November 1985 and entered service on 17 April 1986, the first active vessel in the class. The ship is registered in Ottawa, Ontario, and homeported at St. John's, Newfoundland and Labrador.

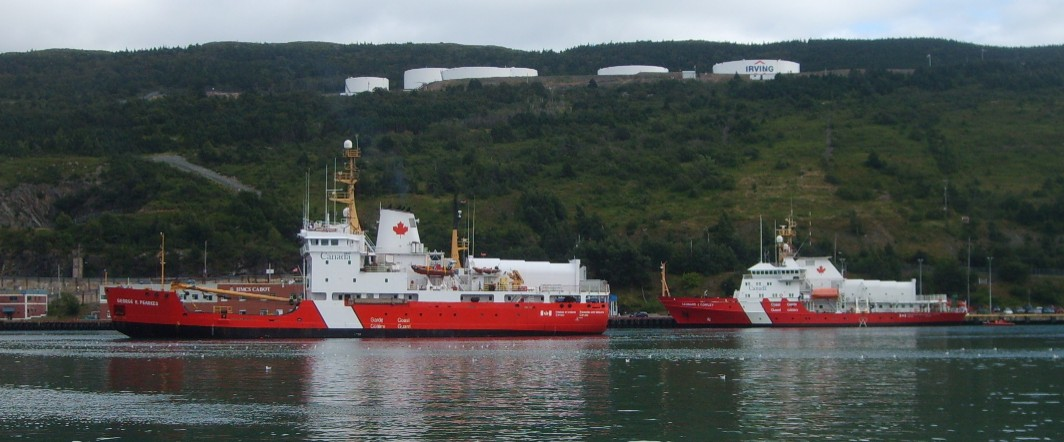
CCGS George. R. Pearkes and CCGS Leonard J. Cowley in St. John's, August 2008

The vessel was initially assigned to the Pacific region and then transferred to the Quebec region. In 2004, George R. Pearkes deployed to the Newfoundland and Labrador region, based at St. John's. The vessel is used for buoy placement, retrieval and monitoring, scientific research, construction programs, search and rescue, icebreaking, and pollution control. In December 2013, the ship was sent to recover oil from the sunken bulk carrier Manolis L which had sunk in 1985 off the Change Islands.

On 20 August 2015, the ship rescued four people and their boat after their engine had failed in Frobisher Bay, 50 nautical miles (93 km) from Iqaluit. Responding to the distress call on 19 August, drift ice threatened the rescue and the recovery of the boat and its occupants only took place the following morning on 20 August. George R. Pearkes returned them to Iqaluit. In March 2016, Canadian Coast Guard trials with the Schiebel Camcopter S-100 took place aboard George R. Pearkes off the Atlantic coast of Canada.

In 2022 it was announced that George R. Pearkes would undergo a $36.14 million refit at Heddle Shipyards in Hamilton, Ontario, as part of the Canadian Coast Guard's efforts to modernize its fleet. The vessel returned to service in the summer of 2025.
