= EVRS =

EVRS may refer to:

- European Vertical Reference System
- ICAO code for Spilve Airport, Riga
