= European Combined Geodetic Network =

European Combined Geodetic Network (ECGN) is a research project aimed at high accuracy geoid determination. The purpose of ECGN is to connect the height systems obtained via geometric positioning by GNSS with gravity-referenced heights with a cm-level accuracy. The effects of the atmosphere, the oceans and time-dependent parameters of the solid Earth on the gravity field are investigated. ECGN uses the data of satellite gravity missions CHAMP, GRACE and GOCE to model the Earth's gravity field and is linked to other gravity-related projects (GMES, GEOSS, GGOS). The ECGN is considered as a European contribution to the International Association of Geodesy (IAG) project Global Geodetic Observation System (GGOS). ECGN is managed by EUREF.
