= Choke ring antenna =

Directional antenna to receive GNSS signals

Patent diagram of a choke ring antenna

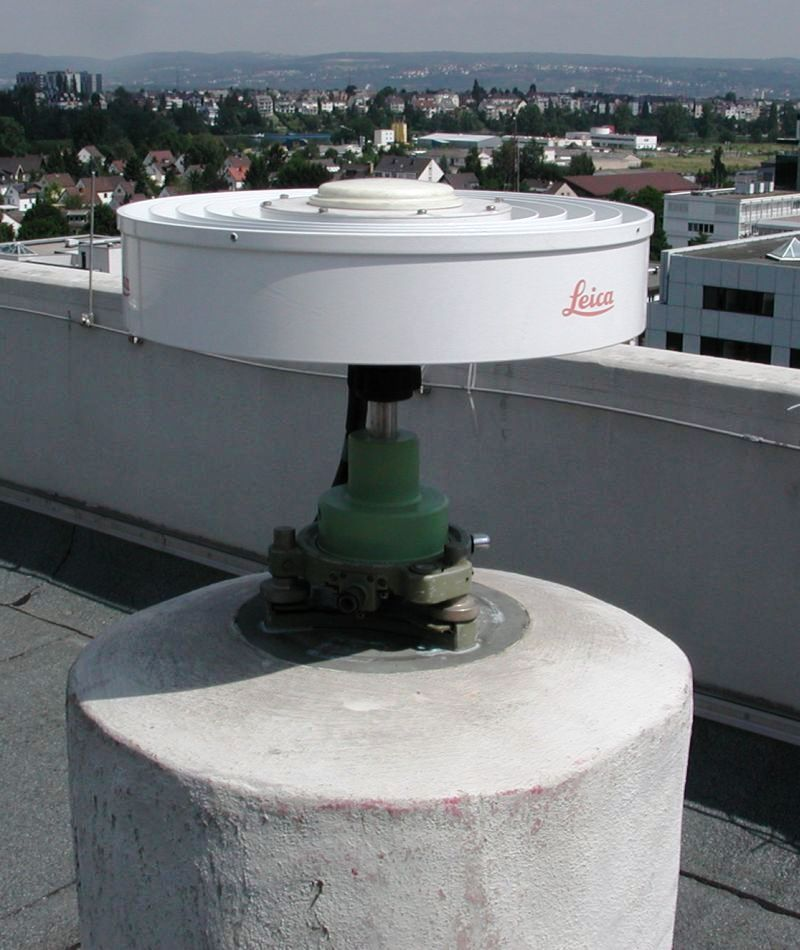
Choke ring antenna at a DGPS Reference Station

A choke ring antenna is a directional antenna designed for reception of GNSS signals from satellites. It consists of a number of concentric conductive cylinders around a central antenna.

The first choke ring antennas were invented at JPL; since 1989 they have been improved and extended by many companies.

Due to its intricate construction, it is often enclosed in a protective cover or radome when placed outside and exposed to the elements.

== Benefits ==
Choke ring antennas have excellent phase center stability, polarization purity, suppression of radiation below the horizon and multipath rejection. This makes them highly suited for satellite navigation. In a GNSS ground-based receiver, a choke ring antenna can provide millimeter precision measurements for use in surveying and geological measurements.

== See also ==
- Patch antenna - a directional type of antenna.
- Magellan Navigation - one manufacturer of this product.
- Trimble Inc. - another manufacturer of this product.
