= European Terrestrial Reference System 1989 =

Geodetic reference frame fixed to the Eurasian Plate

The European Terrestrial Reference System 1989 (ETRS89) is an ECEF (Earth-Centered, Earth-Fixed) geodetic Cartesian reference frame, in which the Eurasian Plate as a whole is static. The coordinates and maps in Europe based on ETRS89 are not subject to change due to the continental drift.

The development of ETRS89 is related to the global ITRS geodetic datum, in which the representation of the continental drift is balanced in such a way that the total apparent angular momentum of continental plates is about 0. ETRS89 was officially born at the 1990 Florence meeting of EUREF, following its Resolution 1, which recommends that the terrestrial reference system to be adopted by EUREF will be coincident with ITRS at the epoch 1989.0 and fixed to the stable part of the Eurasian Plate. According to the resolution, this system was named European Terrestrial Reference System 89 (ETRS89). Since then ETRS89 and ITRS diverge due to the continental drift at a speed about 2.5 cm per year. By the year 2000 the two coordinate systems differed by about 25 cm.

The 89 in its name does not refer to the year of solution (realization), but rather the year of initial definition, when ETRS89 was fully equivalent to ITRS. The solutions of ETRS89 correspond to the ITRS solutions. For each ITRS solution, a matching ETRS89 solution is being made. ETRF2000, for example, is an ETRS89 solution, which corresponds to ITRF2000. ETRS89 is realized by EUREF through the maintenance of the EUREF Permanent Network (EPN) and continuous processing of the EPN data in a few processing centres. Users have access to ETRS89 via EPN data products and real-time streams of differential corrections from a set of public providers based on the EPN stations. The transformation from ETRS89 to ITRS is time-dependent and was formulated by C. Boucher, Z. Altamimi, and X. Collilieux

ETRS89 is the EU-recommended frame of reference for geodata for Europe. It is the only geodetic datum to be used for mapping and surveying purposes in Europe. It plays the same role for Europe as NAD-83 for North America. (NAD-83 is a datum in which the North American Plate as a whole is static, and which is used for mapping and surveying in the US, Canada, and Mexico.) ETRS89 is based on the GRS80 ellipsoid.

EUREF recommends ETRS89 realisation ETRF2000 for mapping purposes. Although different realisations are used by national mapping agencies, the differences are generally at centimetre level. The EPSG ensemble of all ETRS89 realisations has an accuracy of 0.1 metre.

The most important EPSG codes for ETRS89 are:

- EPSG:4258 2D geographic ETRS89 ensemble
- EPSG:4937 3D geographic ETRS89 ensemble
- EPSG:9067 2D geographic ETRF2000
- EPSG:7931 3D geographic ETRF2000
- EPSG:9423 compound: 2D geographic ETRS89 + EVRF2019 height (mean-tide)

== See also ==
- WGS 84
- ED50
- AFREF
- Degrees minutes seconds (DMS)
- Geodetic datum
- KMZ file, a zipped KML file
- Latitude
- Longitude
- Universal Transverse Mercator coordinate system (UTM)
