= FV Monte Galineiro =

History

Spain Ensign
- Name: Monte Galineiro
- Identification: IMO number: 9329239
- Fate: Sank off the coast of Newfoundland on February 23, 2009.

General characteristics
- Length: 30 m (98 ft)
- Crew: 22

The FV Monte Galineiro was a Spanish fishing vessel that sank 400 km (250 mi) off the coast of Newfoundland on February 22, 2009.

The CCGS Leonard J. Cowley of the Canadian Coast Guard was doing a routine patrol when it responded to the Monte Galineiro's distress call, and arrived within ten minutes, rescuing all twenty-two of the vessel's crew. The cause of the sinking is not currently clear but was possibly caused by a fire. The vessel sank within twenty minutes; many crew were found in the water without life jackets, and one was in his underwear. One crew member was treated for hypothermia and one for smoke inhalation. The crew members were from Spain, Ghana, Morocco and Romania.
