= African Geodetic Reference Frame =

Project designed to unify the many geodetic reference frames of Africa

The African Geodetic Reference Frame (AFREF) is a project designed to unify the many geodetic reference frames of Africa using data from a network of permanent Global Navigation Satellite Systems (GNSS) stations as the primary data source for the implementation of a uniform reference frame.

== See also ==
- European Terrestrial Reference System 1989
