= Radio Technical Commission for Maritime Services =

International standards organization

The Radio Technical Commission for Maritime Services (RTCM) is a non-profit international standards organization. Although started in 1947 as a U.S. government advisory committee, RTCM is now an independent organization supported by its member organizations from all over the world.

In the United States, marine communications and navigation are regulated by the Federal Communications Commission, U.S. Coast Guard, and international standards, with RTCM providing technical guidance, such as Digital Selective Calling, Emergency Position Indicating Radio Beacons, Electronic Navigation Charts, and the Automatic Identification System.

== Special committees ==
RTCM Special Committees are formed to provide in-depth areas of concern to the RTCM membership, these special committees normally produce documents in the form of standards.

Current special committees are

- Special Committee (SC) 101 on Digital Selective Calling (DSC)
- Joint Special Committee (SC) 101/110 on GPS Equipped Hand Held VHF Radios
- Special Committee (SC) 104 on Differential Global Navigation Satellite Systems (DGNSS). Provides standards that are often used in Differential GPS and Real Time Kinematic operations.
- Special Committee (SC) 109 on Electronic Charts
- Special Committee (SC) 110 on Emergency Beacons (EPIRBs and PLBs)
- Special Committee (SC) 117 on Maritime VHF Interference
- Special Committee (SC) 119 on Maritime Survivor Locator Devices
- Special Committee (SC) 112 on Ship Radar
- Special Committee (SC) 117 on Maritime VHF Interference
- Special Committee (SC) 119 on Maritime Survivor Locating Devices
- Special Committee (SC) 121 on Automatic Identification Systems (AIS) and digital Messaging
- Special Committee (SC) 123 on VHF-FM Digital Small Message Services
- Special Committee (SC) 127 on Enhanced Loran (eLoran)
- Special Committee (SC) 128 on Satellite Emergency Notification Device (SEND)
- Special Committee (SC) 134 on Integrity for High-Accuracy GNSS Applications
- Special Committee (SC) 135 on Radio Layers for Real-Time DGNSS Applications
- Special Committee (SC) 136 on Beacon Type Approvals
- Special Committee (SC) 137 on Electromagnetic Compatibility Requirements for LED Devices and other Unintentional Emitters Located Near Shipboard Antennas
- Special Committee (SC) 138 on Ranging Mode (R-Mode) Application for VHF Data Exchange System (VDES)

== See also ==
- National Marine Electronics Association
- Networked Transport of RTCM via Internet Protocol (NTRIP)
