= Tide gauge =

Device for measuring the change in sea level relative to a datum

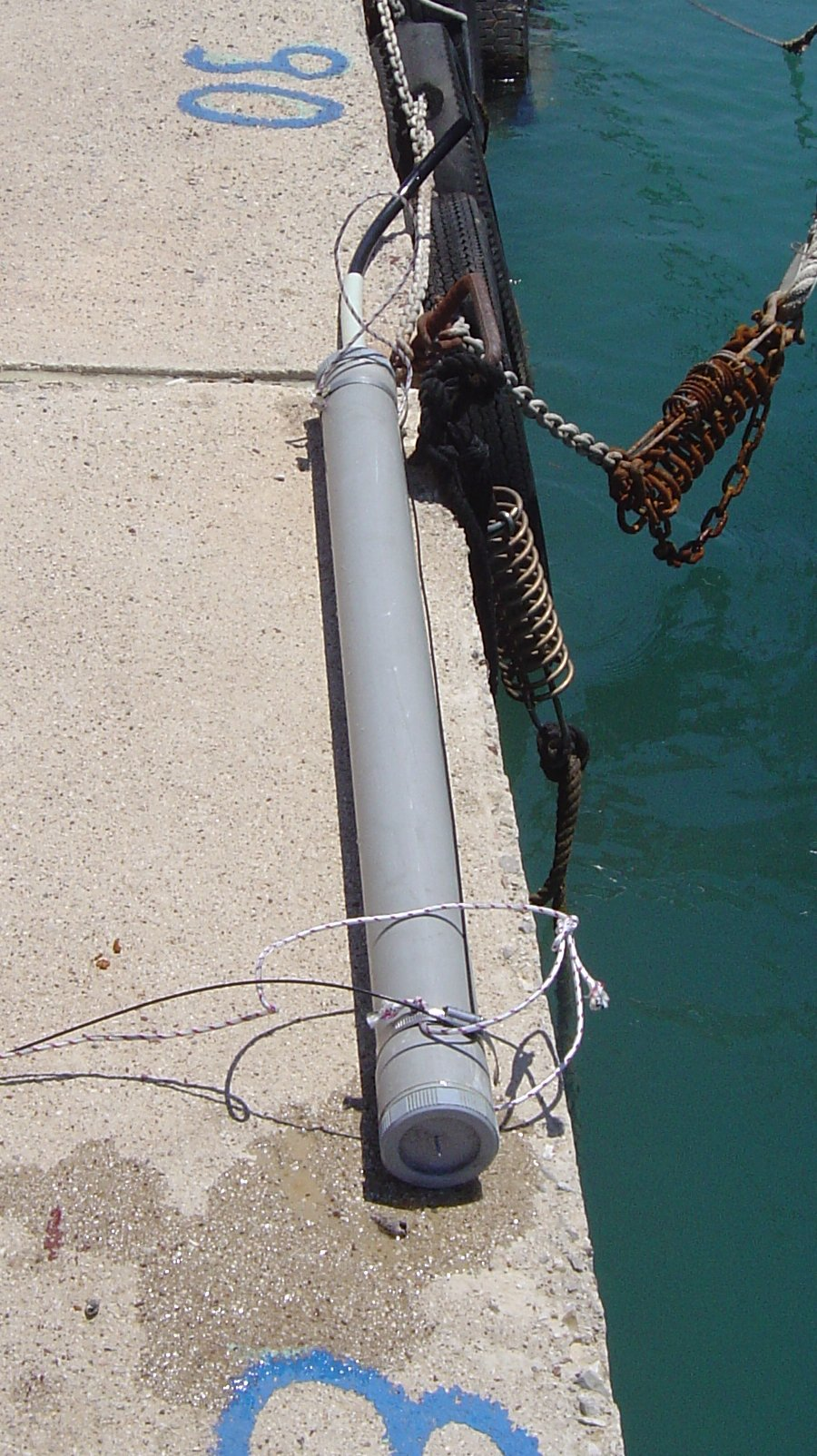
A tide gauge

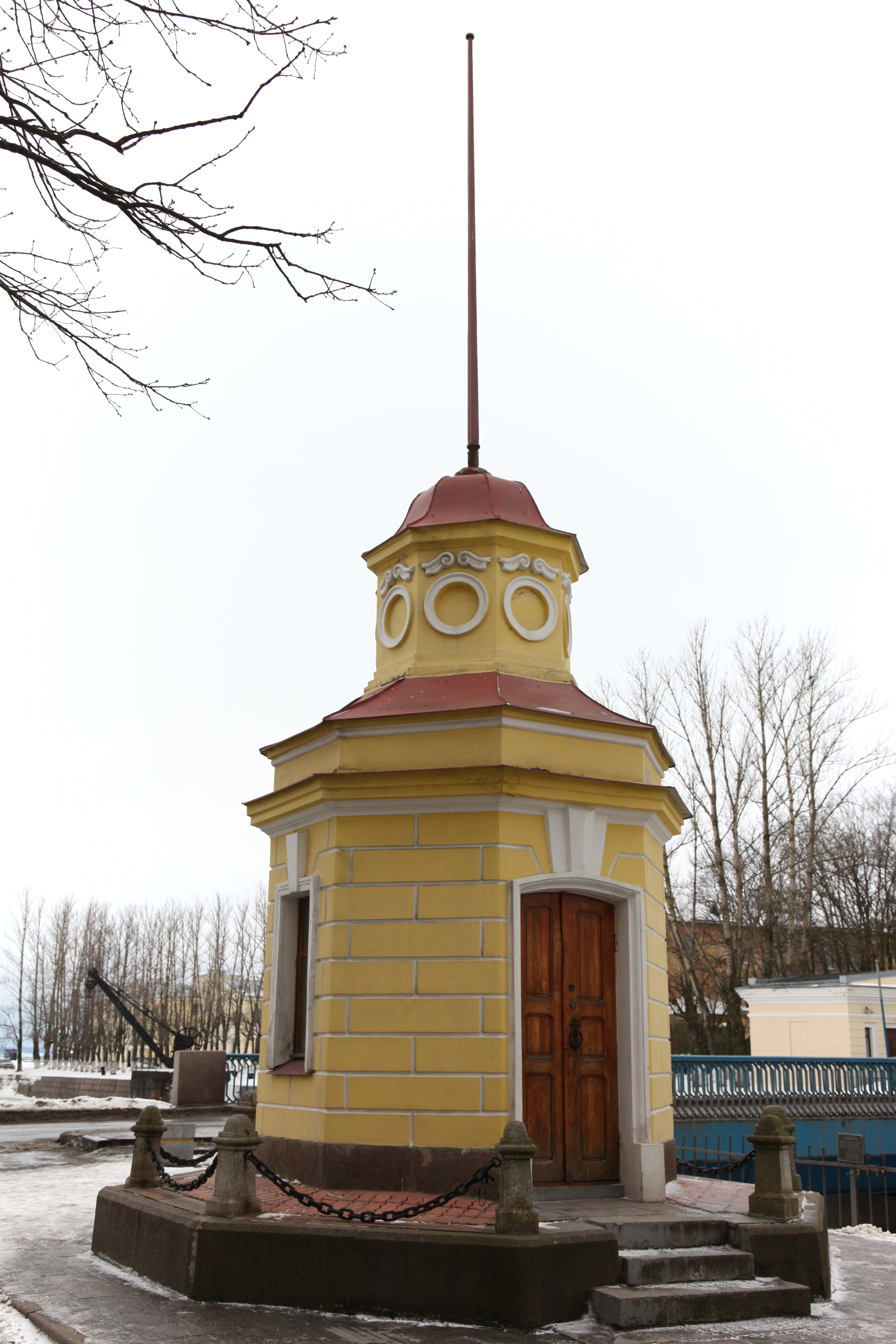
The tide gauge in Kronstadt, Russia

A tide gauge is a device for measuring the change in instantaneous sea level, including periodic tides and long-term sea level rise, relative to a vertical datum. It is also known as a mareograph, marigraph, and sea-level recorder. When applied to freshwater continental water bodies, the instrument may also be called a limnimeter. Stream gauges may record water level, discharge, or both. In general, a water level sensor may be used in arbitrary bodies, such as reservoirs or a tank.

== Operation ==
Sensors continuously record the height of the water level with respect to a height reference surface close to the geoid. Water enters the device by the bottom pipe (far end of the tube, see picture), and electronic sensors measure its height and send the data to a tiny computer.

Historical data are available for about 1,450 stations worldwide, of which about 950 have provided updates to the global data center since January 2010. At some places, records cover centuries; for example Amsterdam has data dating back to 1700.

When it comes to estimating the greater ocean picture, new modern tide gauges can often be improved upon by using satellite data.

Tide gauges are used to measure tides and quantify the size of tsunamis. The measurements make it possible to derive the mean sea level. Using this method, sea level slopes up to several 0.1 m/1000 km and more have been detected.

A tsunami can be detected when the sea level begins to rise, although warnings from seismic activity can be more useful.

== History ==
Sea-level measurements were made using simple measuring poles or "tide staffs" until around 1830, when self-recording gauges with mechanical floats and stilling wells were introduced.

Tidal poles and float gauges were the primary means of sea-level measurement for over 150 years and continue to operate at some locations today. While still part of modern-day tide gauge instrumentation, these technologies have since been superseded by pressure gauges (similar to depth gauges), acoustic/ultrasonic gauges, and radar gauges.

The following types of tide gauges have been used historically:

- Kelvin type tide gauge
- Fuess type tide gauge
- GSI type tide gauge
- High accuracy automatic tide gauge
- High resolution automatic tide gauge

== Common applications ==
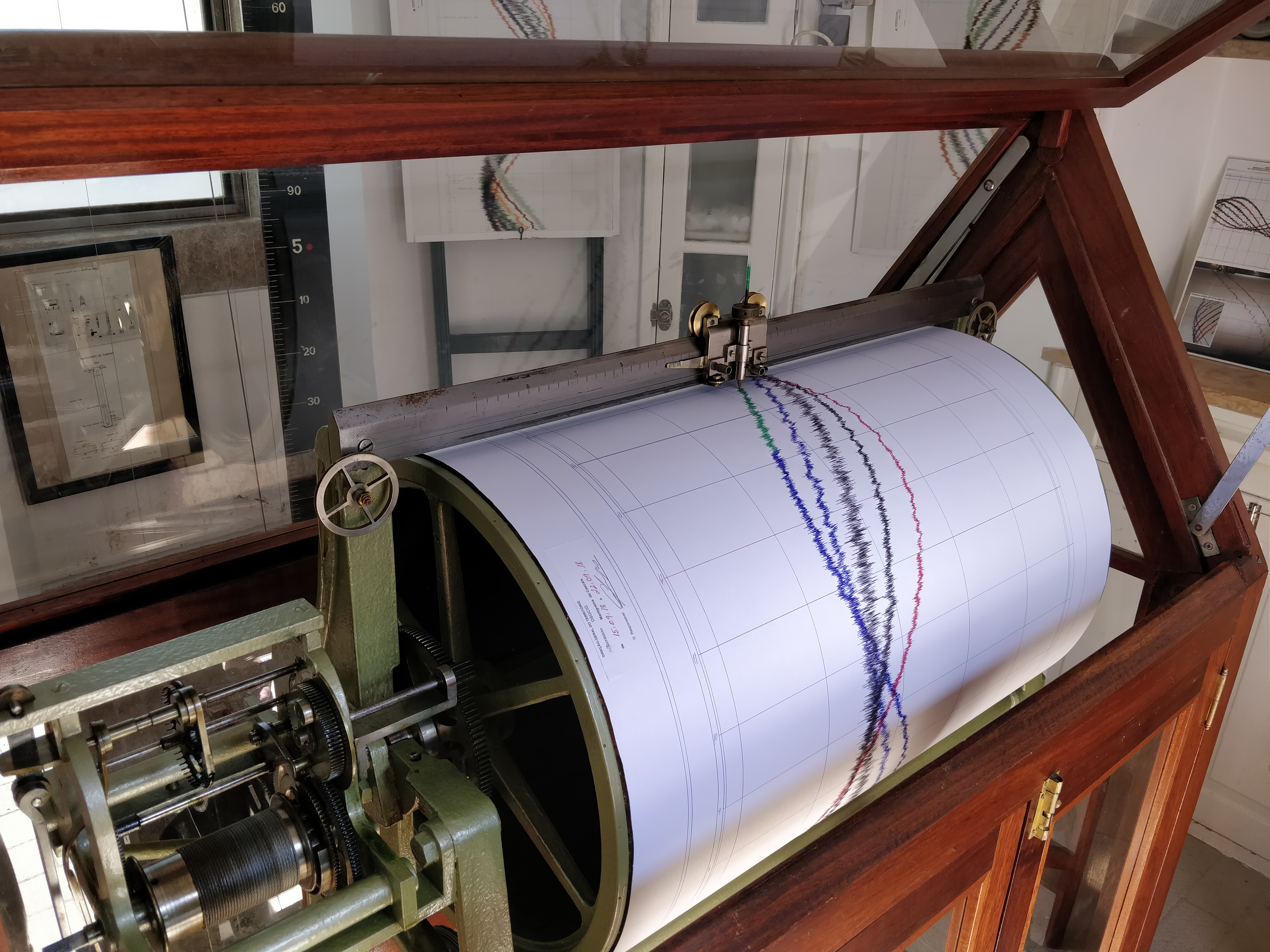
Interior view of Cascais Tide Gauge showing data recording equipment

Tide gauges have a practical application in the shipping and fishing industries where low or high tide levels can hinder or prohibit access to shallow bays or locations with bridges. An example is the Cascais tide gauge in Portugal, which was originally installed because of the sand bar in the River Tagus that causes difficulties for shipping entering Lisbon port. Because of similar problems many industries have installed private tide gauges in ports around the world, and also rely on government agencies (such as NOAA).

Data collected from tide gauges is also of interest to scientists measuring global weather patterns, the mean sea water level, and trends - notably those potentially associated with global warming.

== Modern gauges ==
In recent years new technologies have developed allowing for real-time, remote tide information to be published online via a solar powered wireless connection to a tide sensor. Acoustic/ultrasonic sensors have already been deployed to great effect and the data is regularly broadcast via Twitter and also displayed online.

== See also ==
- Level sensor
- Sea level rise
- Stream gauge
- Fort Denison#Tide gauge
