= Economic Prosperity Network =

The Economic Prosperity Network is an alliance of trusted partners with the United States formed in the wake of the COVID-19 pandemic, which was seen to disrupt global supply chains. The United States government wants it to include Australia, India, Japan, New Zealand, South Korea and Vietnam. Its discussions include trade, health initiatives, development and aid. Its regular discussions started in March 2020.

Tax incentives and re-shoring subsidies are among measures considered.

== See also ==
- Blue Dot Network (BDN)
- Quadrilateral Security Dialogue (the Quad)
- Trans-Pacific Partnership (TPP), and then Comprehensive and Progressive Agreement for Trans-Pacific Partnership (CPTPP)
