= Multipath mitigation =

Multipath mitigation is a term typically used in Code Division Multiple Access (CDMA) communications and in GNSS navigation to describe the methods that try to compensate for or cancel the effects of the Non Line Of Sight (NLOS) propagation. The multipath effect occurs when a signal is received not only through a Line of Sight (LOS) path, but also through one or several NLOS paths. The multipath, if not addressed or compensated, can significantly reduce the performance of the communication and navigation receivers. Various multipath mitigation methods can be used to estimate and remove the undesired NLOS components.

Chip manufactures of CDMA and GNSS receivers, such as Qualcomm, Leica, NovAtel, Septentrio, etc. typically have multipath mitigation algorithms supported by their chipsets. One of the first works in the field of GPS multipath mitigation is in
