= Manolis L =

The Manolis L was a Liberian-flagged ship that sank in Newfoundland and Labrador's Notre Dame Bay in 1985, together with her damaging supply of toxic fuel oil. The ship was a timber carrier, that sank to 85 metres (279 ft). She contained 150,000 litres (33,000 imp gal) of fuel oil. She ran aground on Blow Hard Rock, off Change Islands.

The oil was contained, within the ship, until a storm in 2013 cracked the hull. Since then some oil leaked from the hull, and the Canadian Coast Guard was able to contain some of that oil. But the wreck was described as a "ticking time bomb", that could have suffered a total rupture of the oil tank, at any time.

For a period of five years, the Manolis L Citizens Response Committee advocated for the removal of the oil through public awareness campaigns that included art exhibits, a protest march and other means to keep the issue in the public eye while meeting with stakeholders, government officials and Coast guard regularly to keep apprised of the efforts. The committee was integral to the eventual resolution of the issue.

The Federal Conservative government under Stephen Harper refused to address the issue, however when the Liberal party under Justin Trudeau came to power they ordered a technical assessment of the wreck. This assessment was undertaken in 2016, Because of the extreme pressure changes, it took an hour to descend. They were only able to spend half an hour working before they had to spend an hour and a half managing their return to the surface. The recommendation of Coast Guard was to remove the remaining oil.

Meanwhile the government created and passed Bill C-64 to fill the legislative vacuum surrounding abandoned and derelict vessels in Canada.

Efforts to safely pump out the oil began on August 8, 2018. Because of the depth the work was performed by remotely operated vessels. The oil was completely removed by September 8, 2018.

Later that year, the Manolis L Citizens Response Committee dissolved and its financial assets were divided between the East Coast Law Association and the Newfoundland and Labrador Environmental Network.
