= Regional Reference Frame Sub-Commission for Europe =

EUREF
- Regional Reference Frame Sub-Commission for Europe
- Founded: 1987
- Headquarters: Frankfurt, Germany
- Members: more than 30 countries
- Key people: M. Lidberg, President; K. Kollo, Secretary; W. Soehne, Chair of the Governing Board
- Affiliations: International Association of Geodesy
- Website: www.euref.eu

Regional Reference Frame Sub-Commission for Europe (EUREF) is the sub-commission of the International Association of Geodesy (IAG) that deals with the definition, realization and maintenance of the European geodetic reference frame. The goal of EUREF is to establish a unified geodetic datum for Europe, the European Terrestrial Reference System 1989 (ETRS89), and a consistent network of reference stations (EPN) throughout Europe. EUREF was founded in 1987 at the IUGG General Assembly held in Vancouver.

== Mission ==
EUREF is driven by a voluntary agreement of scientific organisations and national geodetic/geographic agencies of the member countries, who are willing to replace their legacy national geodetic datums with a unified European Reference Frame and join their national networks of reference stations into a common European network. The mandate of EUREF is to foster and coordinate the activities of the member countries, which are financed and managed on the national level. EUREF realizes and maintains ETRS89, the European geodetic datum, which is to become a single datum used for geodetic applications in all the member countries. A key instrument in maintaining ETRS89 is the EUREF Permanent Network (EPN), a network of reference stations which covers the European continent. EUREF is also working on the European Vertical Reference System (EVRS), which goal is to determine a unified dm-level accurate geoid model and gravity-referenced height system throughout Europe. EUREF coordinates its activities with EuroGeographics.

== Structure ==
The activities of EUREF are discussed and decisions are taken at the annual symposium. The last symposia have been attended by more than 120 participants coming from about 30 member countries of Europe. The results of EUREF are available in the symposia proceedings, which contain the presented scientific papers as well as national reports, resolutions and documentation. Current activities are led by the Governing Board (GB), formerly Technical Working Group (TWG), which is elected at the symposia and is meeting three times a year to manage current activities. The minutes of the GB meetings are published online together with the symposia proceedings.

== European Terrestrial Reference System 1989 ==
ETRS89 is a Cartesian coordinate reference system, in which the Eurasian Plate as a whole is static. Within Europe, coordinates and maps based on ETRS89 are stable because temporal variations due to the continental drift are minimized. ETRS89 coincided with the global International Terrestrial Reference System (ITRS) datum in 1989, hence the name. ETRS89 and ITRS diverge due to continental drift at a speed about 2.5 cm per year.

== Vertical system and frame ==
European Vertical Reference System (EVRS) is a zero-tidal gravity-related height reference system (vertical datum). It is realized by the geopotential numbers and normal heights of the United European Leveling Network (UELN), also known as the Reseau Européen Unifié de Nivellement (REUL). EVRS heights are computed in certain intervals from the latest measurements of the UELN participating countries. So far, three realizations of EVRS have been published, as European Vertical Reference Frames (EVRF): EVRF2000, EVRF2007, and EVRF2019.

== Projects ==
There are several projects under development at EUREF.

- EUREF Permanent Network (EPN) is the main project of EUREF and a backbone in the maintenance of the European Terrestrial Reference System 1989.
- European Combined Geodetic Network (ECGN) is a research project aimed at high accuracy geoid determination.
- EUVN Densification Action studies discrepancies between EUVN (European United Vertical Network) and the gravimetric geoid.
- Unified European Levelling Network (UELN) manages the development of the European levelling network.
- ETRS89 velocity field model studies residual local movements of the Eurasian Plate relative to ETRS89.
