= Networked Transport of RTCM via Internet Protocol =

Protocol for streaming GPS corrections

- Communication protocol
- Abbreviation: NTRIP
- Purpose: Streaming of RTCM SC-104 data
- Developer(s): Radio Technical Commission for Maritime Services
- Introduction: September 2004; 21 years ago
- Based on: HTTP/1.1; RTSP
- Port(s): 2101 (TCP/UDP)

The Networked Transport of RTCM via Internet Protocol (NTRIP) is a protocol for streaming satellite navigation (GNSS) data over the Internet. NTRIP is a generic, stateless protocol based on the Hypertext Transfer Protocol (HTTP/1.1) based on the RTCM SC-104 protocol for GNSS data streams.

The specification is standardized by the Radio Technical Commission for Maritime Services (RTCM). NTRIP was developed by the German Federal Agency for Cartography and Geodesy (BKG) and the Dortmund University Department of Computer Science. NTRIP was released in September 2004; the initial version was based on HTTP over TCP. As of April 2026, the latest version is RTCM 10410.1 Standard for Networked Transport of RTCM via Internet Protocol (Ntrip) Version 2.0 with Amendment 2, January 12, 2021 (US$ 215.00). Version 2.0 can be based on HTTP/1.1 over TCP, HTTP/1.1 over UDP (HTTPU), or Real-Time Streaming Protocol (RTSP).

== Availability ==
A simplified version of NTRIP 1.0 used to be available for free. It does not have any protocol details or examples, and refers to purchase the document from RTCM.

RTCM-NTRIP provides open-source (GPL v2) implementations of NTRIP: a minimal client-server pair (ntripclient and ntripserver) and a feature-rich BKG Ntrip Client (BNC). The open-source Real-time Kinematic Library (RTKLIB) also implements NTRIP. Under GPLv2, it is legal to reverse-engineer the protocol using the code provided.

Another open-source (Apache License v2) implementation of NTRIP is provided by the Orekit space-flight dynamics library, allowing to parse RTCM correction messages, RTCM ephemeris messages as well as IGS generic SSR messages.

== Service providers ==
Data from International GNSS Service can be obtained from five providers for free (some of which require registration): BKG, CAS, NASA CDDIS, Geoscience Australia, UCAR. There are site-specific streams containing observation data (for dGPS/RTK) and state-space data (for PPP) as well as combined state-space streams. Multi-GNSS is used.
