= RINEX =

Receiver Independent Exchange Format for raw satellite navigation system data

Receiver Independent Exchange Format
- Filename extension: .rnx
- Developed by: International GNSS Service (IGS) / Radio Technical Commission for Maritime Services (RTCM)
- Initial release: 1989; 37 years ago
- Latest release: 4.02; September 1, 2025; 7 months ago
- Type of format: NSS observation/correction format, ASCII
- Free format?: Yes
- Website: https://igs.org/formats-and-standards/

In the field of geodesy, Receiver Independent Exchange Format (RINEX) is a data interchange format for raw satellite navigation system data. This allows the user to post-process the received data to produce a more accurate result — usually with other data unknown to the original receiver, such as better models of the atmospheric conditions at time of measurement.

The final output of a navigation receiver is usually its position, speed or other related physical quantities. However, the calculation of these quantities are based on a series of measurements from one or more satellite constellations. Although receivers calculate positions in real time, in many cases it is interesting to store intermediate measures for later use. RINEX is the standard format that allows the management and disposal of the measures generated by a receiver, as well as their off-line processing by a multitude of applications, whatever the manufacturer of both the receiver and the computer application.

The RINEX format is designed to evolve over time, adapting to new types of measurements and new satellite navigation systems. The first RINEX version was developed by W. Gurtner in 1989 and published by W. Gurtner and G. Mader in the CSTG GPS Bulletin of September/October 1990. Since 1993 the RINEX 2 is available, which has been revised and adopted several times. RINEX enables storage of measurements of pseudorange, carrier-phase, Doppler and signal-to-noise from GPS (including GPS modernization signals e.g. L5 and L2C), GLONASS, Galileo, Beidou, along with data from EGNOS and WAAS satellite based augmentation systems (SBAS), QZSS, simultaneously. RINEX version 3.02 was submitted in April 2013 and contain new observation codes from GPS or Galileo systems.

The RINEX format is maintained by the International GNSS Service (IGS) thanks to its dedicated RINEX Committee currently chaired by Dr. Francesco Gini, from the European Space Agency. The latest RINEX formats can be accessed via the IGS's RINEX Documents and Formats page.

== Allied formats ==
=== Ionospheric data ===
The RINEX format includes coarse ionosphereic data as broadcast by the satellites. Higher-precision data grids are written in the separate but similar (also ASCII-based) IONosphere-map EXchange (IONEX) format. Developed to standardize the sharing of Total Electron Content (TEC) maps derived from Global Navigation Satellite System (GNSS) signals, IONEX files are essential for understanding the impact of ionospheric conditions on GNSS signal propagation.

As GNSS signals traverse the ionosphere, they experience distortion due to the ionised plasma present in this region. This distortion results in delays and changes in signal direction, influenced by factors such as satellite elevation and solar position. Consequently, analysis of GNSS signals at ground stations yields critical insights into the ionosphere's state, particularly the density of free electrons, which is a key parameter affecting signal quality.

IONEX files consist of an ASCII format that includes a comprehensive header with global information, followed by a data section detailing TEC maps. TEC is measured in terms of the number of free electrons per square meter in a vertical column of the ionosphere, with a standard density of 10^{16} electrons representing one unit of TEC.

In addition to TEC maps, IONEX files also provide Root Mean Square (RMS) error maps and height maps, enhancing the understanding of ionospheric variations.

=== GEO SBAS ===
A RINEX-derived format is available for recording the information broadcast by geosynchonous (GEO) satellite-based augmentation service (SBAS) satellites. GEO & SBAS data are part of RINEX v 3.01 and above.

=== Station solutions ===
The Solution (Software/technique) INdependent EXchange Format (SINEX) is used to indicate station position/velocity solutions. This ASCII-based format is similar to RINEX. There are also variants for GNSS code and phase biases (Bias-SINEX) and tropospheric and meteorological data (Tropo-SINEX).

=== Antenna data ===
The ASCII Antenna Exchange Format (ANTEX) provides information on antennas (both satellite and ground).

== Compression ==
Although not part of the RINEX format, the Hatanaka compression scheme is commonly used to reduce the size of RINEX files, resulting in an ASCII-based CompactRINEX or CRINEX format. It uses third-order delta compression to reduce the number of characters needed to store time, clock, and observation data.

Both RINEX and CRINEX files are also commonly used with general-purpose compressors such as gzip and bzip2. Using a general-purpose compressor on top of CRINEX provides maximum compression.
