= Mariner's astrolabe =

Nautical navigational instrument

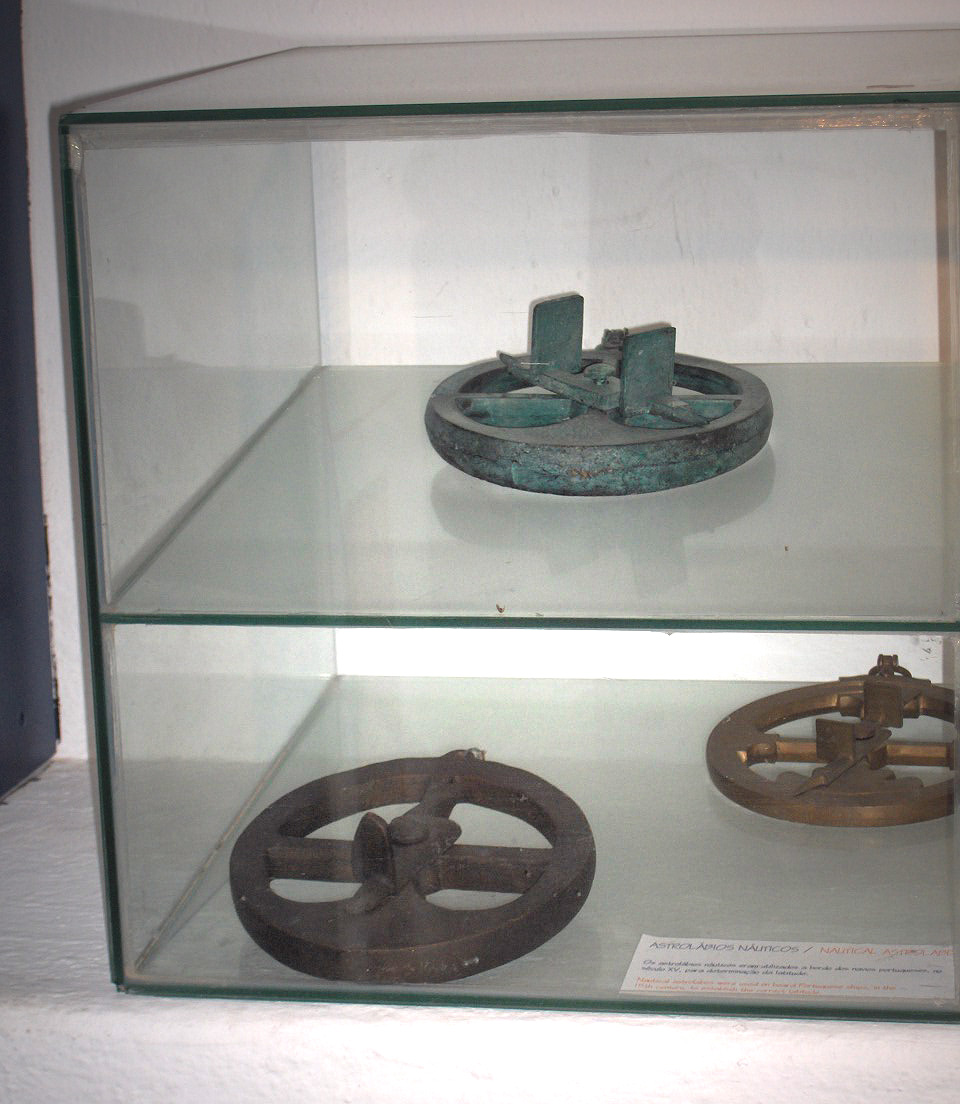
Three mariner's astrolabes in the Museum of the Forte da Ponta da Bandeira; Lagos, Portugal

The mariner's astrolabe, also called sea astrolabe, was an inclinometer used to determine the latitude of a ship at sea by measuring the sun's noon altitude (declination) or the meridian altitude of a star of known declination. Not an astrolabe proper, the mariner's astrolabe was rather a graduated circle with an alidade used to measure vertical angles. They were designed to allow for their use on boats in rough water or heavy winds, which astrolabes are ill-equipped to handle. It is notable for its role during the Age of Exploration when Portuguese and Spanish navigators used it to great success. In the sixteenth century, the instrument was also called a ring.

== History ==
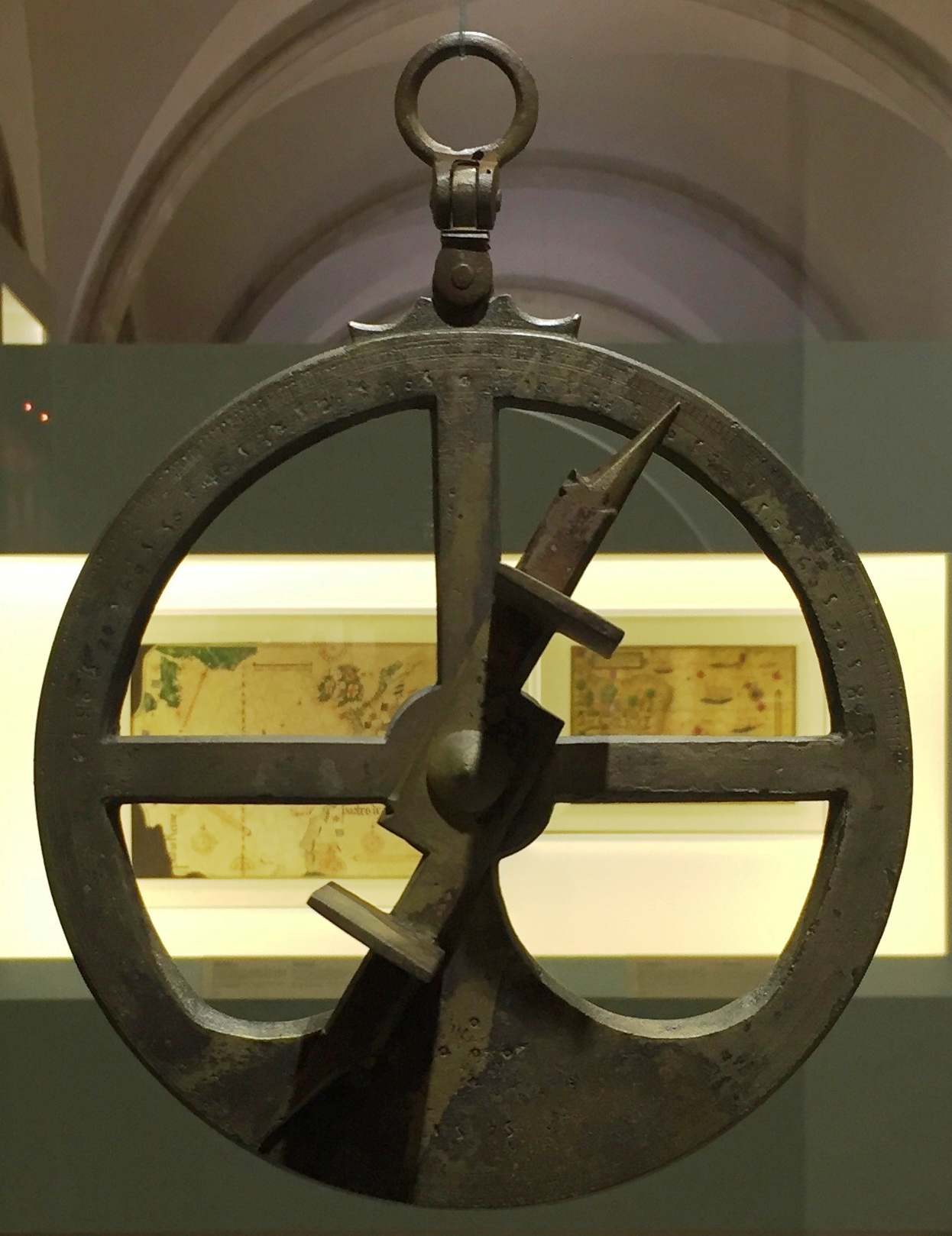
Mariner's astrolabe from circa 1600.

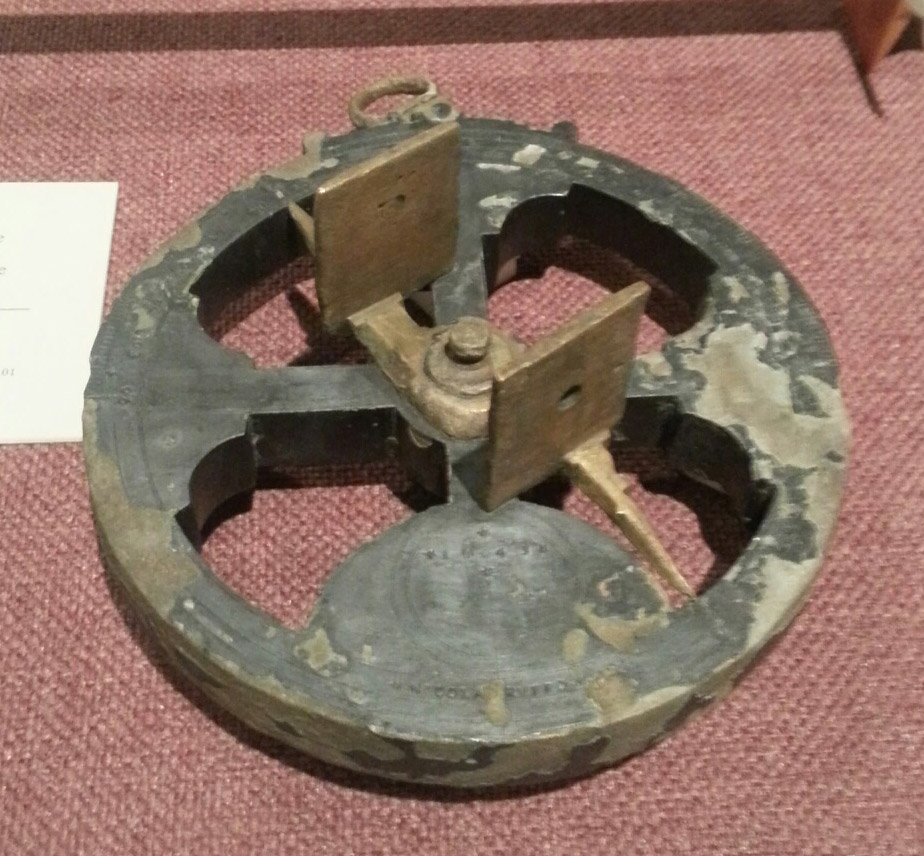
Mariner's astrolabe made in 1645 by Nicolao Ruffo at The Mariners' Museum

Many dates can be found for the appearance of the first mariner's astrolabes. The earliest date, 1295, is offered by the Majorcan astronomer Ramon Llull. Later dates center around the late 15th century, with Samuel Purchas claiming that it was adapted for marine navigation by Martin Behaim, a mariner not considered a trustworthy source by some historians. In any event, the instrument was certainly known by the end of the 15th century. Nevertheless, the creation and perfecting of the mariner's astrolabe is attributed to Portuguese navigators during the beginning of Portuguese discoveries. The earliest known description of how to make and use a sea astrolabe comes from Martín Cortés de Albacar’s Arte de Navegar published in 1551, although the basic principle is the same as that of the archipendulum used in constructing the Egyptian pyramids.

There is strong evidence that the mariner's astrolabe was derived directly from the planispheric astrolabe, as the earliest examples retain some of the markings (e.g. umbra recta and umbra versa) of the prior device without having the same components.

The mariner's astrolabe would have replaced or complemented instruments such as the cross staff or quadrant as a navigator's instrument. The mariner's astrolabe was used until the middle or, at the latest, the end of the 17th century. It was replaced by more accurate and easier-to-use instruments such as the Davis quadrant. By the late 18th century, mariners began using the sextant and then LORAN C, SatNav/Transit, and then global positioning systems (GPS) starting in the 1980s.

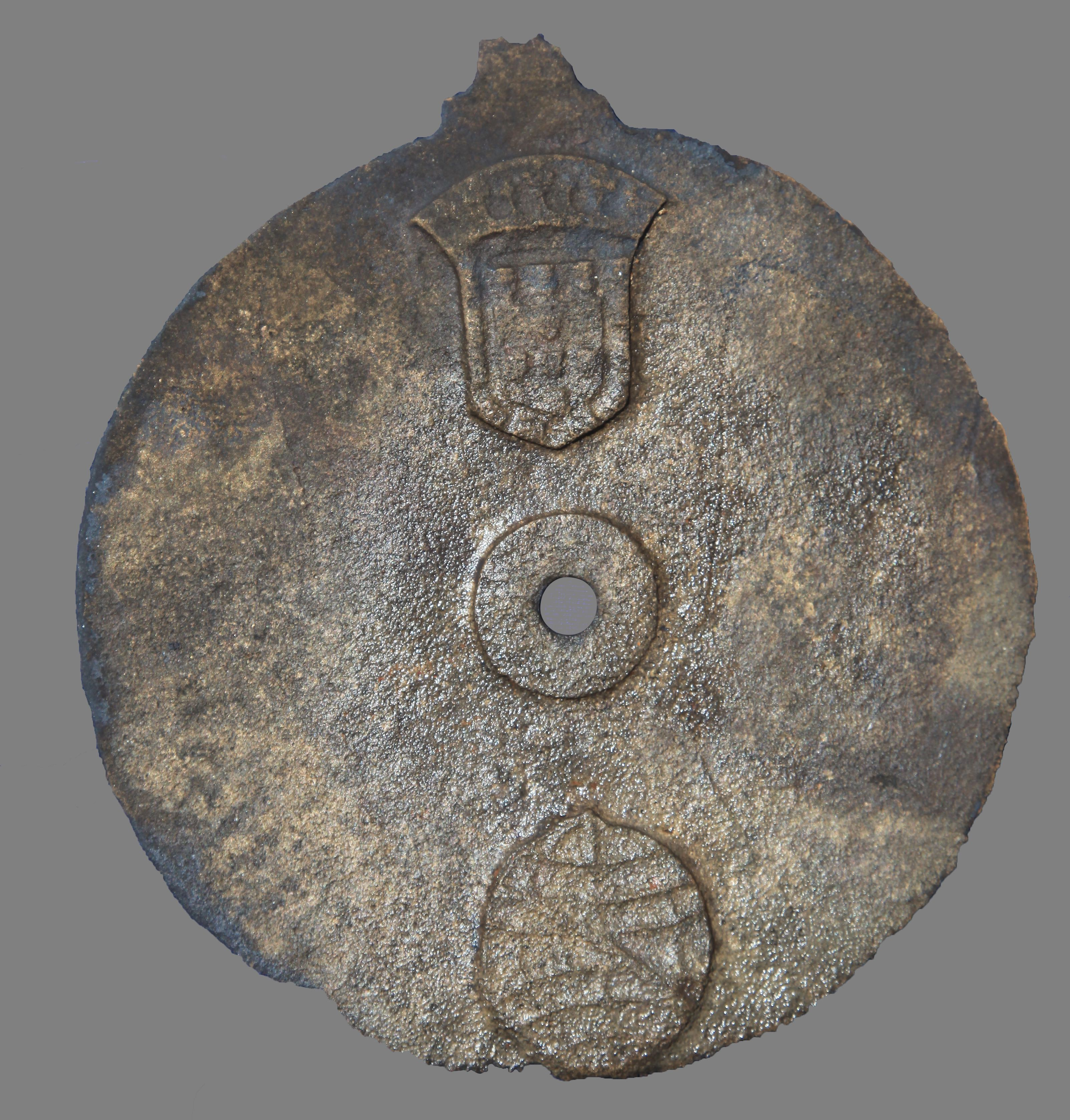
Sodré astrolabe, the oldest mariner's astrolabe in National Museum of Oman, Muscat

Although their heavy brass construction permits their longevity in marine environments, mariner's astrolabes are very rare today. In 2017, only 108 were known to exist. The biggest collection remains in museums in Portugal. The Corpus Christi Museum of Science and History in Texas, United States, contains a mariner's astrolabe with a confirmed date of 1554, salvaged from the wreck of the San Esteban.

A disk-type astrolabe dated between 1496 and 1501, now the world's oldest, was discovered in 2014 by the marine scientist David L. Mearns on the wreck site of a Portuguese nau Esmeralda, which sank off the coast of Oman in 1503. The astrolabe was confirmed by laser scanning, which revealed a series of 18 gradations marking 5-degree intervals, and has been named the Sodré astrolabe. It has been proposed that the Sodré astrolabe is a transitional instrument between the classic planispheric astrolabe from which the first mariner's astrolabes made of brass were adapted and the open‐wheel type astrolabe that came into use sometime before 1517.

== Construction ==
Mariner's astrolabes were made of brass. Since weight was advantageous when using the instrument on the heaving deck of a ship or in high winds, other materials, such as wood or ivory, were not desirable though some wood sea astrolabes were made. Early sea astrolabes were made from sheets of brass. Due to their light weight, they tended to perform poorly at sea. Heavier cast brass frames began to be made in the mid-sixteenth century and were considerably better. As the accuracy of the instrument is related to the radius of the divided circle, these were made as large as practical.

Since the large plate form of the planispheric astrolabe makes it sensitive to the wind, the mariner's astrolabe is made with a frame form. The openings in the frame allow wind to pass through, inducing less motion in the instrument.

The essential function of the device was to measure angles. Thus the instrument featured a ring graduated in degrees. Early instruments were only graduated for 90°; later instruments were graduated for the full 360° circle around the limb. The sole purpose of the spokes was to support the pivot point for the alidade. In order to lower the centre of gravity of the device and thus increase its period of motion as a means of stabilizing it, extra brass was usually added to the bottom of the instrument inside the ring. This is clearly evident in the lower left instrument seen in the photograph above.

The alidade was free to rotate about a pin through the centre of the instrument. The vanes of the alidade were either slotted or pierced with a hole to allow the user to align the alidade.

The astrolabe had a ring attached to the top of the instrument to allow it to hang vertically.

== Usage ==
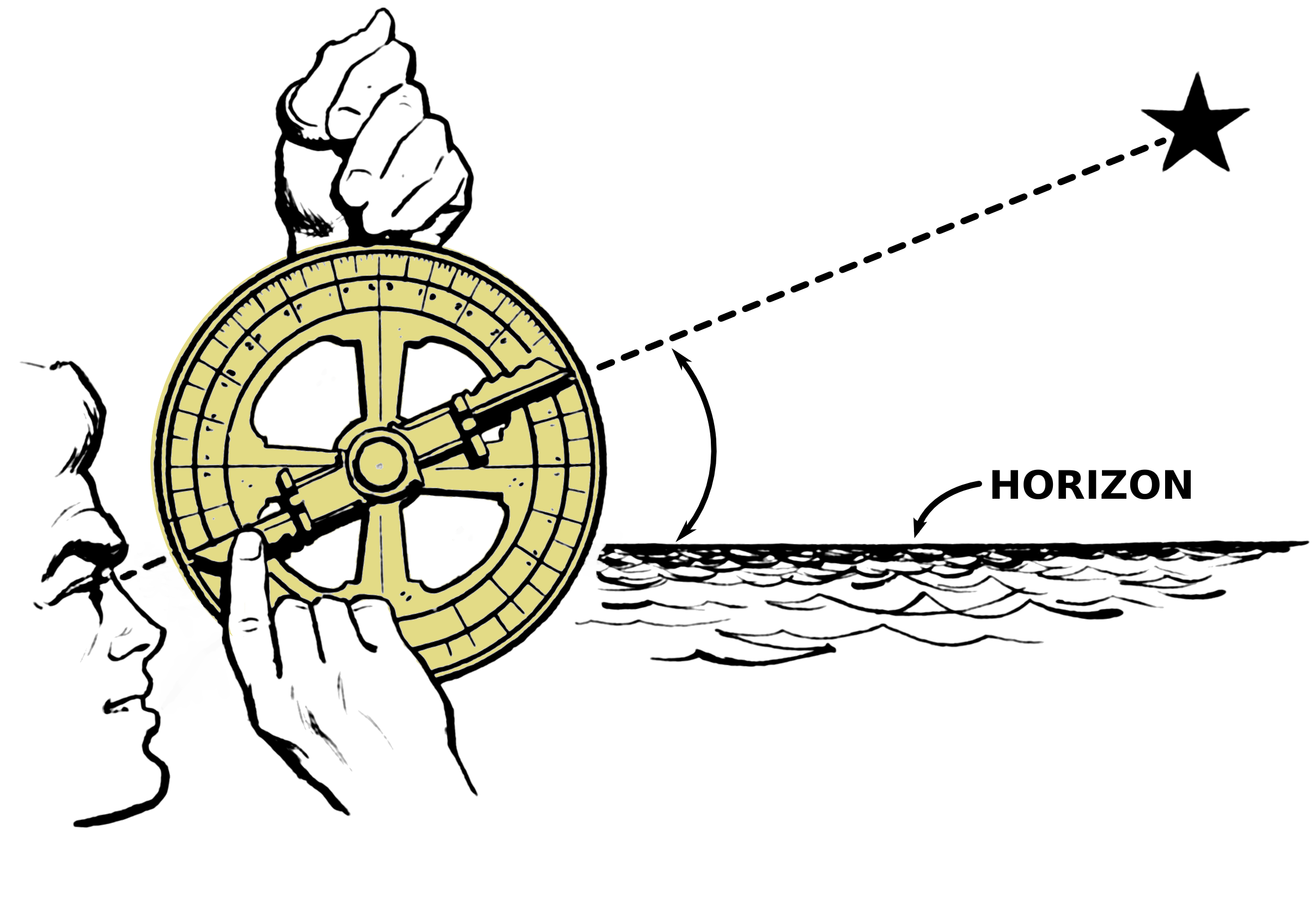
An astrolabe being aligned to a star in the sky

In order to use the astrolabe, the navigator would hold the instrument by the ring at the top. This caused the instrument to remain in a vertical plane. The navigator would then align the plane of the astrolabe to the direction of the object of interest. The alidade was aligned to point at the object and the altitude was read.

If observing a dim object such as a star, the navigator would observe the object directly through the alidade. If observing the Sun, it was both safer and easier to allow the shadow of one of the alidade's vanes to be cast onto the opposite vane.

It played a key part of the Age of Discovery, which Portugal initiated. Portuguese sailors trained British and other sailors – one of the most famous was Christopher Columbus – in how to use this instrument, which became the key to the maritime growth and conquest of the other European Colonial Empires.

== Limitations ==
The mariner's astrolabe needed to be suspended vertically in order to measure the altitude of the celestial object. This meant it could not be used easily on the deck in windy conditions. It could not easily be used to measure the angle between two objects, which was necessary for longitude calculations by the lunar distance method (though that technique was not used when the instrument was developed). Another limitation was that the instrument's angular accuracy was directly proportional to the length of the alidade, which was not very long.

== See also ==
- Octant (instrument)
- Exploration
