= Burnouf =

Burnouf is a surname. Notable people with the surname include:

- Emile Burnouf (1821–1907), Orientalist and author
- Eugène Burnouf (1801–1852), French scholar
- Jean Louis Burnouf (1775–1844), French philologist and translator
- Louis Burnouf
