= Alexander Hamilton (linguist) =

Bombay Marine officer and linguist (1762-1824)

Lieutenant Alexander Hamilton FRS (1762 – 30 December 1824) was a Bombay Marine officer and linguist who was one of the first Europeans to study the Sanskrit language. He taught the language to most of the earliest European scholars of Indo-European linguistics. He became the first professor of Sanskrit in Europe.

== In India ==
Hamilton seems to have been born in India, but Scotland is not impossible. He was a first cousin of his namesake, American statesman Alexander Hamilton. He became a lieutenant in the Bombay Marine and arrived in 1783. While stationed in India he joined the Asiatic Society of Bengal founded by Sir William Jones and Sir Charles Wilkins. He also married a Bengali woman.

== In France ==
After the death of Jones in India, Wilkins and Hamilton were the only Europeans who had studied Sanskrit. Both returned to Europe around 1797. Wilkins remained in England but Hamilton went to France after the Treaty of Amiens (1802) to collate Sanskrit manuscripts held at the Bibliothèque Nationale in Paris.

After war broke out between Britain and France in 1803 Hamilton was interned as an enemy alien, but was released to carry on his researches at the insistence of the French scholar Constantin Volney. Hamilton taught Sanskrit to Volney and others, including Karl Wilhelm Friedrich Schlegel and Jean-Louis Burnouf, the father of Eugene Burnouf. Hamilton spend most of his time compiling a catalogue of Indian manuscripts in the library which was published in 1807. Hamilton lived in Schlegel's house, the former house of Baron d'Holbach in Rue de Clichy, together with Sulpiz Boisserée and his brother.

In 1806 he was appointed at Hertford College, becoming the first Sanskrit professor in Europe. In 1808 Hamilton was elected a Fellow of the Royal Society. He became professor of "Sanscrit and Hindoo literature" at Haileybury College. He assisted Wilkins with his revisions to his translation of the Hitopadesha.

In 1813, Hamilton completed his catalogue of the Bibliothèque Nationale manuscripts. Following the end of the Napoleonic Wars many German scholars came to study with him, notably Franz Bopp and August Wilhelm Schlegel.

== Death ==
Hamilton died at Liscard on 30 December 1824, aged 62.

== Works ==
Hamilton published:

- The Hitopadesa in the Sanscrit Language, London, 1811;
- Terms of Sanscrit Grammar, London, 1815; and
- A Key to the Chronology of the Hindus, 1820.

He also wrote magazine articles on ancient Indian geography. The catalogue was translated, annotated, and published by Louis-Mathieu Langlès in the Magasin Encyclopédique, 1807.
