= Archipendulum =

Builder's instrument for measuring inclination

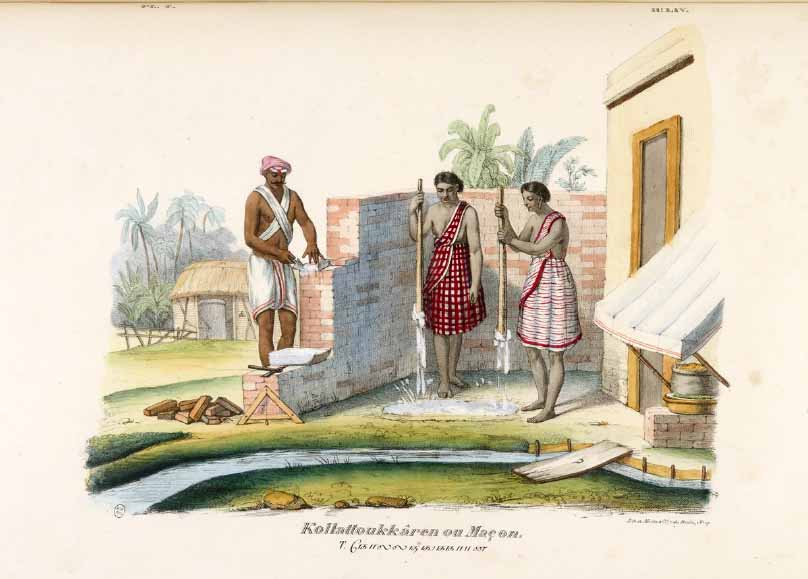
Indian mason at work using an archipendulum from L'Inde française

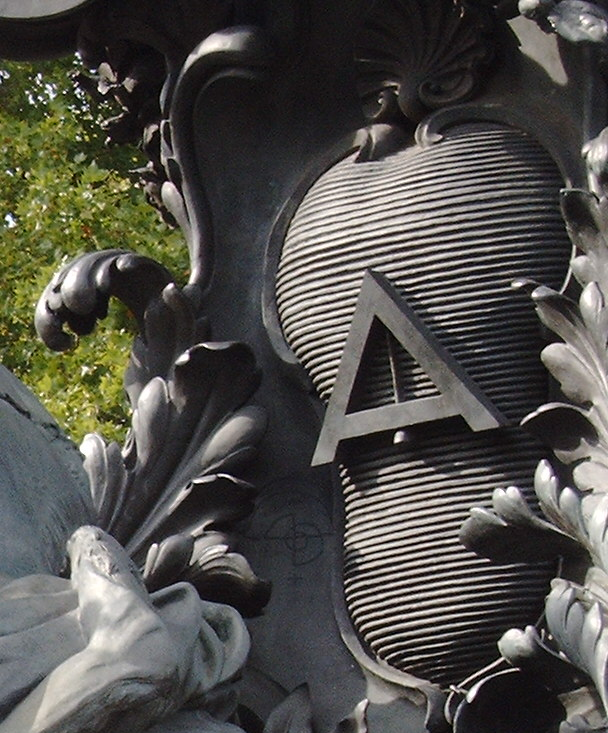

The archipendulum is an ancient ancestor of the spirit level and astrolabe, and was used to check whether a line was horizontal or at a desired inclination. It consisted of a handheld A-shaped construction with a plumbline suspended from the top vertex. The horizontal bar of the A was marked at its midpoint, so that the plumbline's coincidence with this point indicated that the bases of the two legs were at the same level. Other gradations on the horizontal bar enabled the user to construct or verify inclined lines. The same methods of use apply to the inverted 'T' which is simply another variant of the archipendulum.

Used by the builders of the Egyptian pyramids and from the Indian subcontinent, it was more recently described by Johann Heinrich Alsted and Leon Battista Alberti.
