= Jean-Louis Burnouf =

French philologist and translator

- Born: September 14, 1775; Urville, Manche, France
- Died: May 8, 1844 (aged 68)
- Occupation(s): Philologist; Translator

Jean-Louis Burnouf (French: [ʒɑ̃lwi byʁnuf]; September 14, 1775, in Urville, Manche – May 8, 1844) was a French philologist and translator.

== Life and career ==
Burnouf was born on September 14, 1775 in Urville. His father was a poor weaver who died early, leaving him an orphan. After the death of his father he became the mentee of Jean-Baptiste Gardin-Dumesnil a former professor of rhetoric of the Collège d'Harcourt.

He was admitted to the Collège d'Harcourt in Paris on a scholarship where in 1793, he won the prix d'honneur. In his free-time, he learned by himself Grec and German. Burnouf was an early student of Sanskrit, which he studied under Alexander Hamilton.

During the French Revolution, he made his living as a merchant. In 1808, he was substitute at the lycée Charlemagne, two years later, became professor of rhetoric at Luce de Lancival. In 1811, he was named Master at the ENS. In 1817, he was professor of Latin eloquence at the Collège de France, then in 1826, inspector of the Académie de Paris. He was elected a member of the Académie des inscriptions et belles-lettres in 1836.

Jean Louis Burnouf wrote several translations of Latin authors : Sallust, Tacitus, Cicero, Pliny the Younger. He also translated into Latin Antoine-Léonard Chézy's French version of the Yadjanadatta Badha (Sanskrit: Yadjnadatta Vadha, Killing of Yadjnadatta).

He married Marie Geneviève Chavarin with whom he had two children. One of them was Eugène Burnouf (1801-1852), also his great-nephew was Émile-Louis Burnouf, both scholars of Indian civilizations.

He died aged 68.

== Publications ==
- Méthode pour étudier la langue grecque (1813–1814)
- Premiers principes de la grammaire grecque
- Méthode pour étudier la langue latine (1840–1841)
- Souvenirs de jeunesse, 1792-1796 (1888)
