= Plumb bob =

Weighted line used as a vertical reference

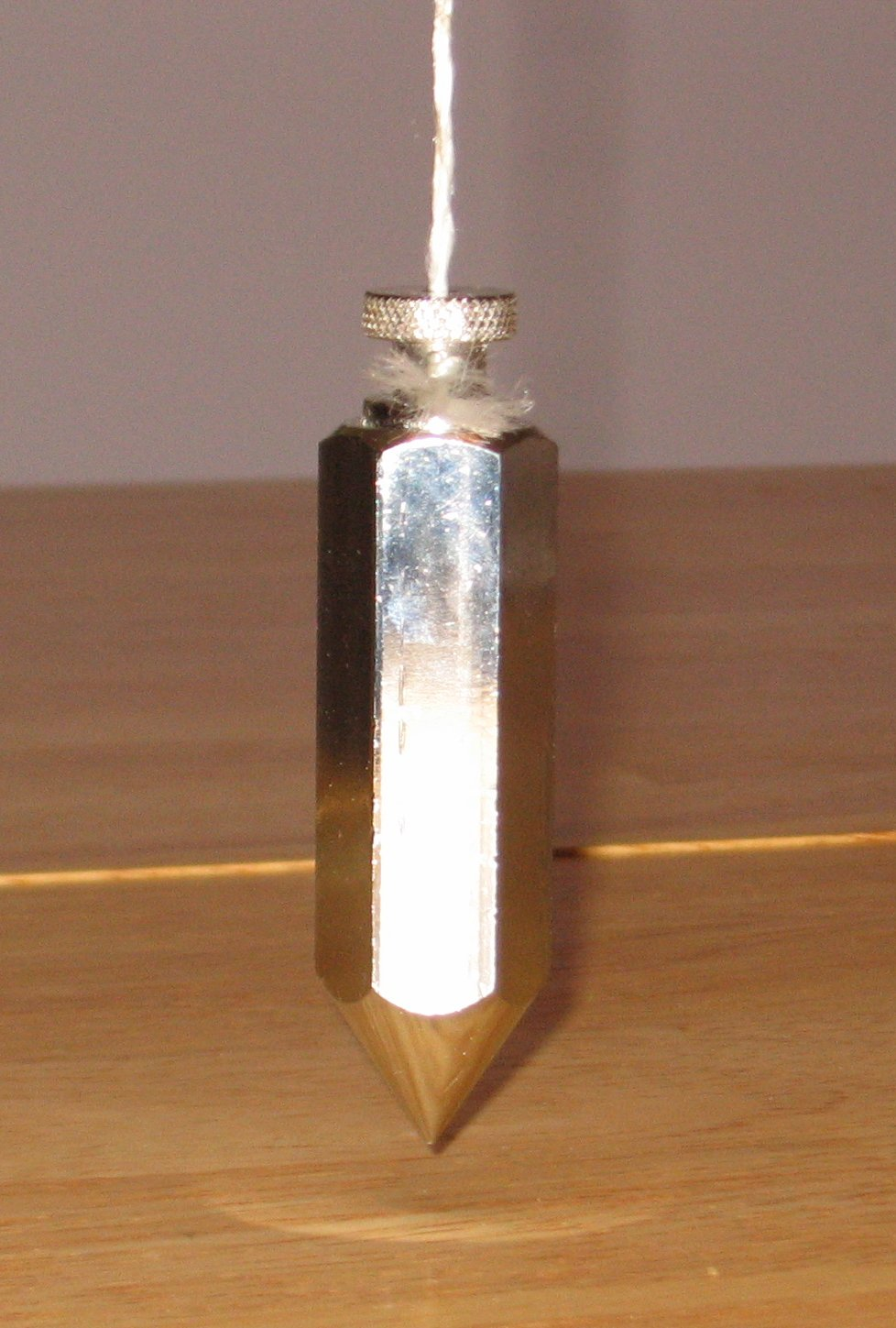
A plumb bob

A plumb bob, plumb bob level, or plummet, is a weight, usually with a pointed tip on the bottom, suspended from a string and used as a vertical direction as a reference line, or plumb line. It is a precursor to the spirit level and used to establish a vertical datum. It is typically made of stone, wood, or lead, but can also be made of other metals. If it is used for decoration, it may be made of bone or ivory.

The instrument has been used since at least the time of ancient Egypt to ensure that constructions are "plumb", or vertical. It is also used in surveying, to establish the nadir (opposite of zenith) with respect to gravity of a point in space. It is used with a variety of instruments (including levels, theodolites, and steel tapes) to set the instrument exactly over a fixed survey marker or to transcribe positions onto the ground for placing a marker.

== Etymology ==
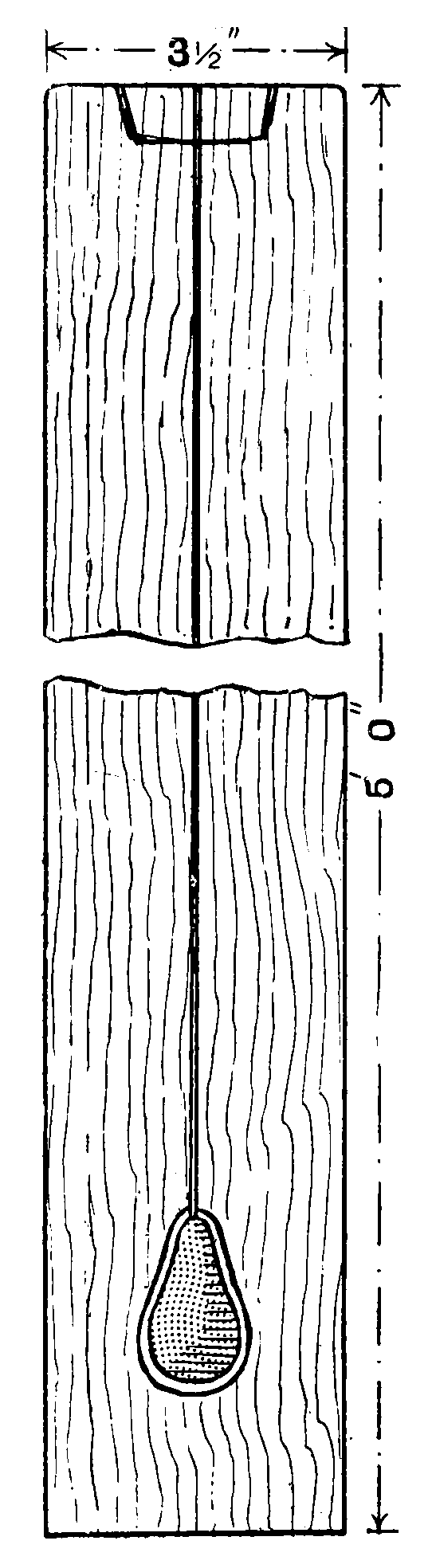
A plumb rule from Cassells' Carpentry and Joinery

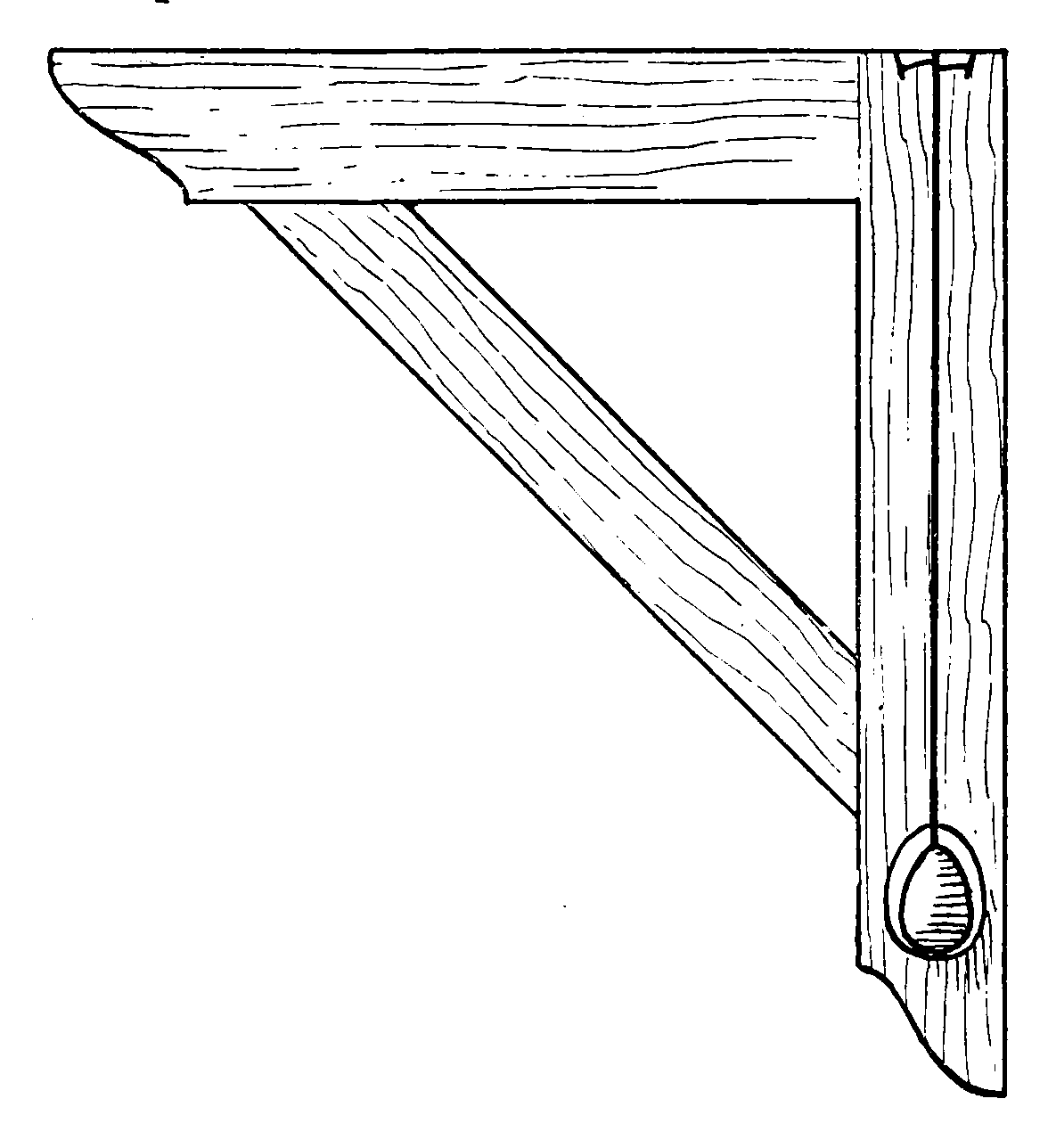
A plumb square from Cassells' Carpentry and Joinery

The plumb in plumb bob derives from Latin plumbum ('lead'), the material once used for the weighted bob at the end. The adjective plumb developed by extension, as did the noun aplomb, from the notion of "standing upright".

== Use ==
Until the modern age, plumb bobs were used on most tall structures to provide vertical datum lines for the building measurements. A section of the scaffolding would hold a plumb line, which was centered over a datum mark on the floor. As the building proceeded upward, the plumb line would also be taken higher, still centered on the datum. Many cathedral spires, domes and towers still have brass datum marks inlaid into their floors, which signify the center of the structure above.

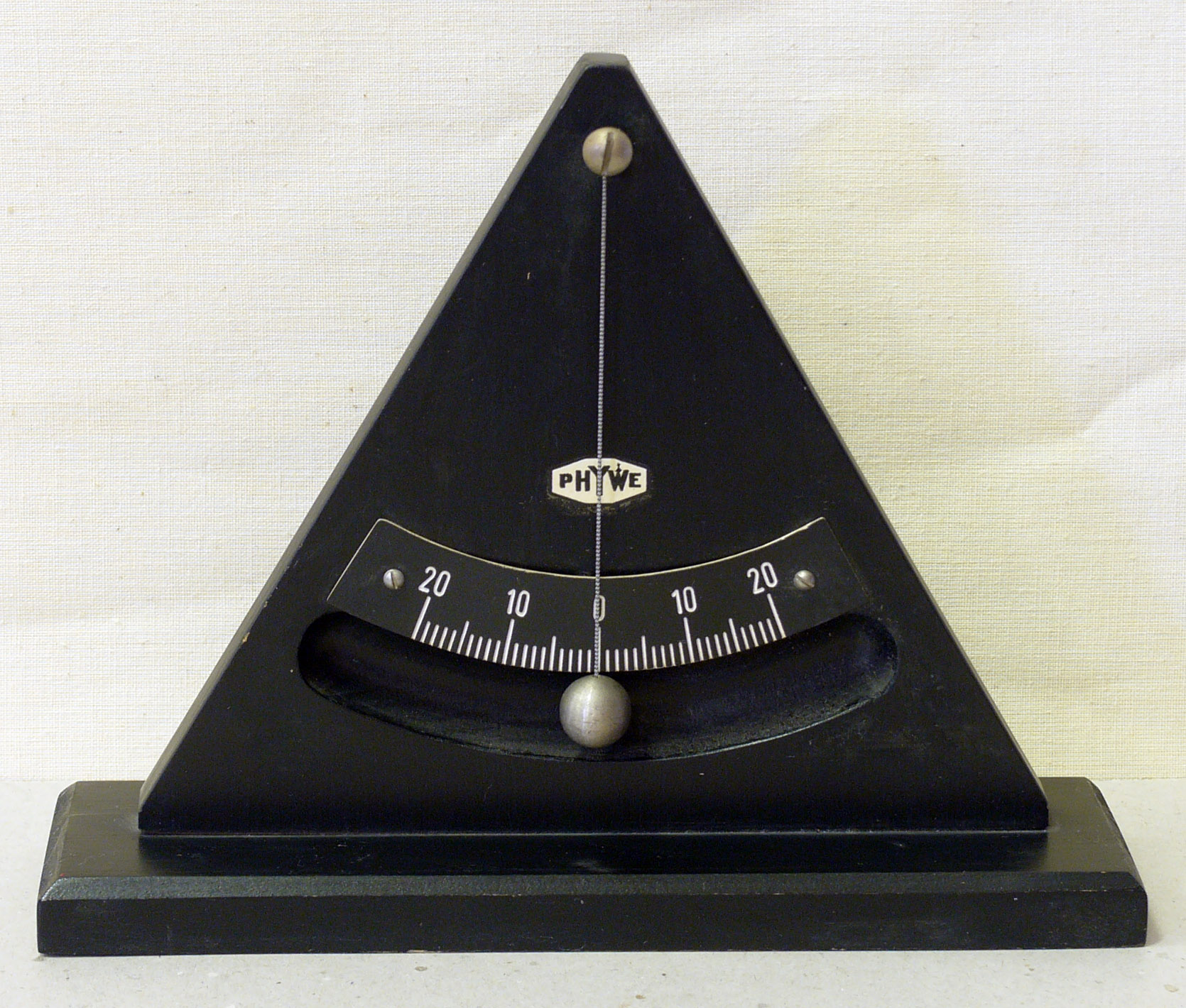
Plumb bob with scale as an inclinometer

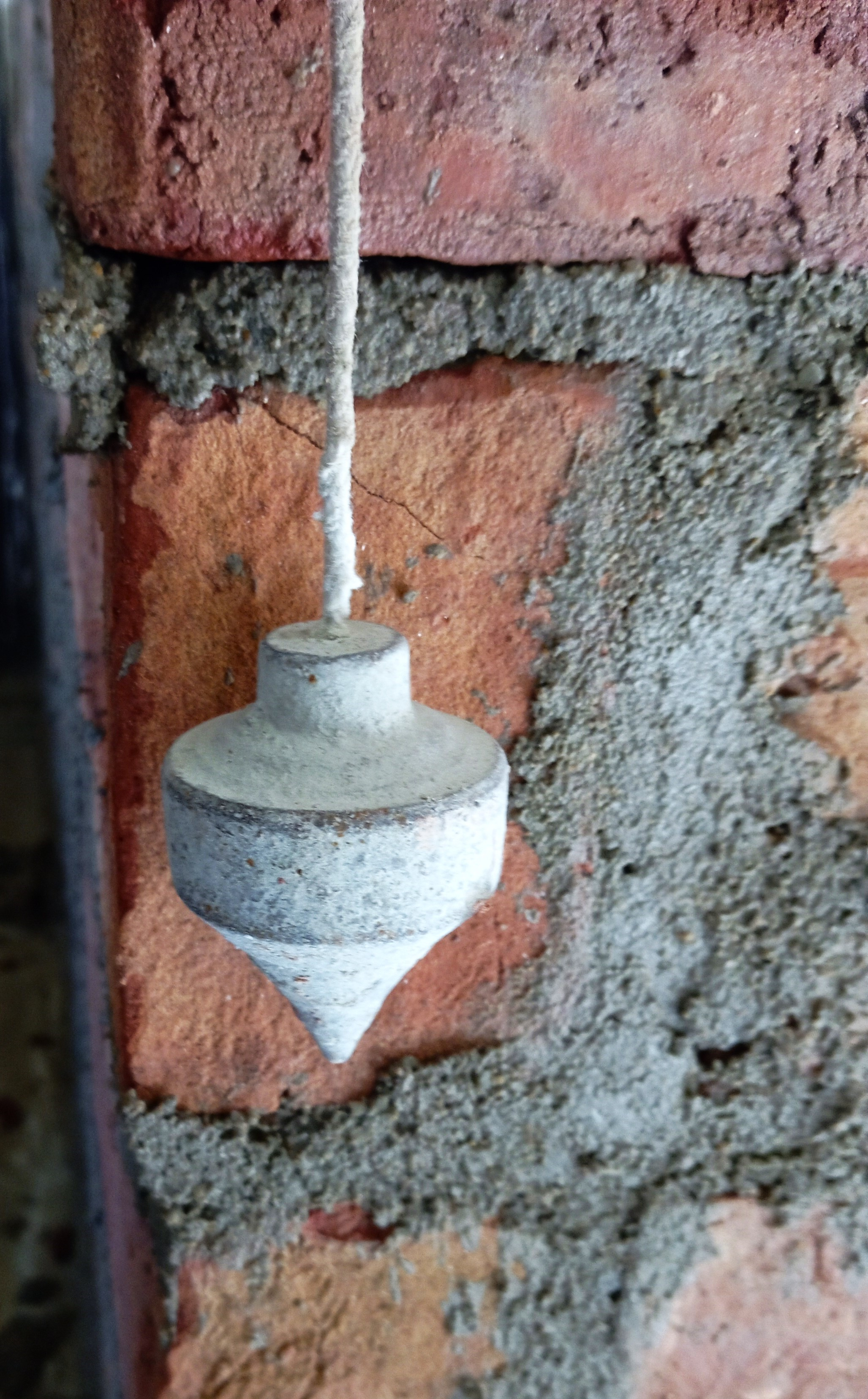
Plumb bob with string in masonry work

A plumb bob and line alone can determine only a vertical reference. However, if they are mounted on a suitable scale the instrument may also be used as an inclinometer to measure angles to the vertical.

Ancient Egyptians used a plumb line attached to the top outer part of a tool resembling a letter E; when placed against a wall, the plumb line would indicate a vertical line. An archipendulum, an A-frame level with a plumb line hung from the vertex was also used to find horizontal; these were used in Europe until the mid–19th century. A variation of this tool has the plumb line hung from the top of an inverted T shape.

The early skyscrapers used heavy plumb bobs, hung on wire in their elevator shafts.

A plumb bob may be in a container of water (when conditions are above freezing temperatures), molasses, very viscous oils or other liquids to dampen any swinging movement, functioning as a shock absorber.

=== Determining center of gravity of an irregular shape ===
Students of figure drawing will also make use of a plumb line to find the vertical axis through the center of gravity of their subject and lay it down on paper as a point of reference. The device used may be purpose-made plumb lines, or simply makeshift devices made from a piece of string and a weighted object, such as a metal washer. This plumb line is important for lining up anatomical geometries and visualizing the subject's center of balance.

== In popular culture ==
Following the release of The Sims in 2000, a green plumb bob has been used as a logo. In game, the plumb bob is used to identify the character selected and their moods. In various expansion packs, bands are added around the plumb bob to represent different life states, such as vampires, mermaids, and aliens.

== See also ==
- Vertical position
