= L'Inde française =

Collection of lithographed plates describing French colonial possessions in India

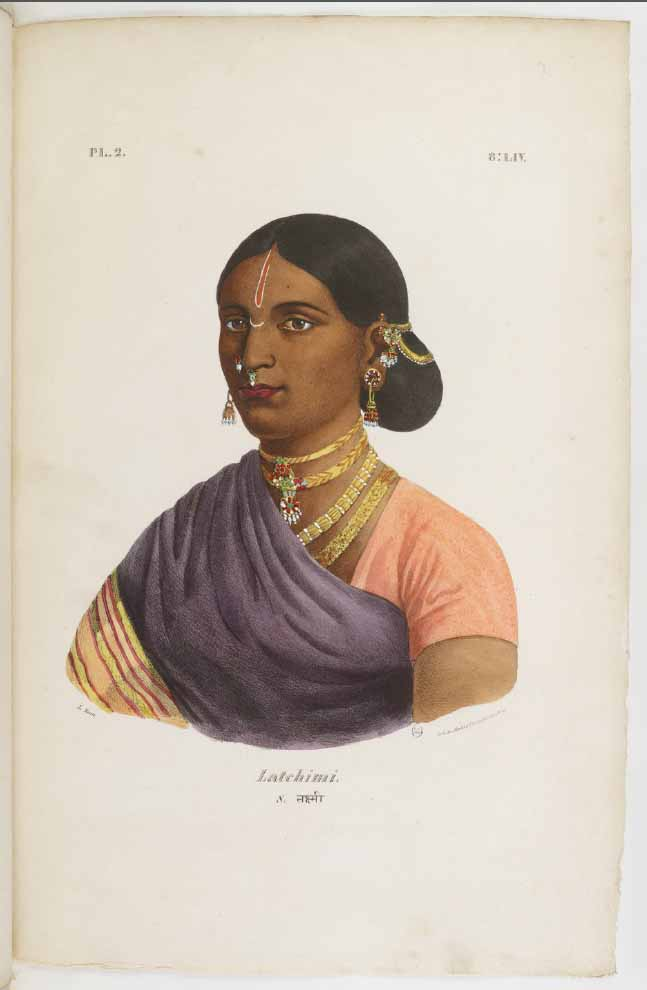
'Latchimi', plate from "L'Inde française"

L'Inde française or "L'Inde française ou Collection de dessins lithographiés représentant les divinités, temples, costumes, physionomies, meubles, armes, et ustensiles, des peuples Hindous qui habitent les possessions françaises de l'Inde, et en général la côte de Coromandel et le Malabar" (transl. French India or Collection of lithographed drawings representing the deities, temples, costumes, physiognomies, furniture, weapons, and utensils, of the Hindu peoples who inhabit the French possessions of India, and in general the coast of Coromandel and the Malabar) was a collection of 144 lithographed plates issued in 25 parts between 1827 and 1835 by J.-J. Chabrelie, and the first important French book on India. L'Inde française was about the French possessions in India, which were colonial possessions rather than mere trading posts. They included Pondichéry, Karikal and Yanaon on the Coromandel Coast, Mahé on the Malabar Coast, and Chandernagor in Bengal.

It was published in Paris in two folio volumes, the first of 90 plates, the second of 54, and the first edition dedicated to Paul Demidoff. The text was written by Eugène Burnouf (1801–1852), a philologist and professor at the Collège de France, and an authority on the Indian subcontinent - he was also considered the father of modern Buddhist studies and produced many translations from Sanskrit. In the preface to L'Inde française, he laments the lack of interest in India shown by his countrymen. The numerous deities of the Hindu pantheon are depicted, as are ceremonies and religious festivals, some notable civil and religious personalities, crafts and costumes sorted by caste, craftsmen, artists and scientists, barber, school teacher, astronomer, writer, doctor, merchant, water carrier, weaver, priest, gardener, launderer, stonemason, singer, dancer and hunter.

The images were painted by A. Géringer, Louis Thomas Bardel, Feuchère, Midy, Weber, Beau, Jacques François Gauderique Llanta, Chénal, Jean-Pierre Thénot, Jean Francois Victor Dollet and Félix-Achille Saint-Aulaire. Mainly, they were worked on by Charles Etienne Pierre Motte (1785–1836), a foremost lithographic printer of the time.

== Gallery ==
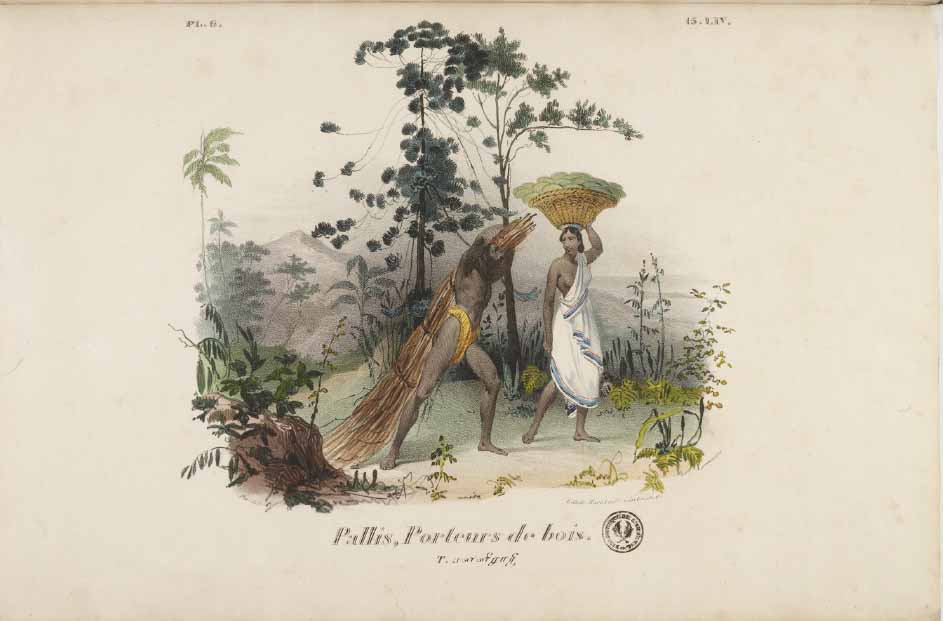

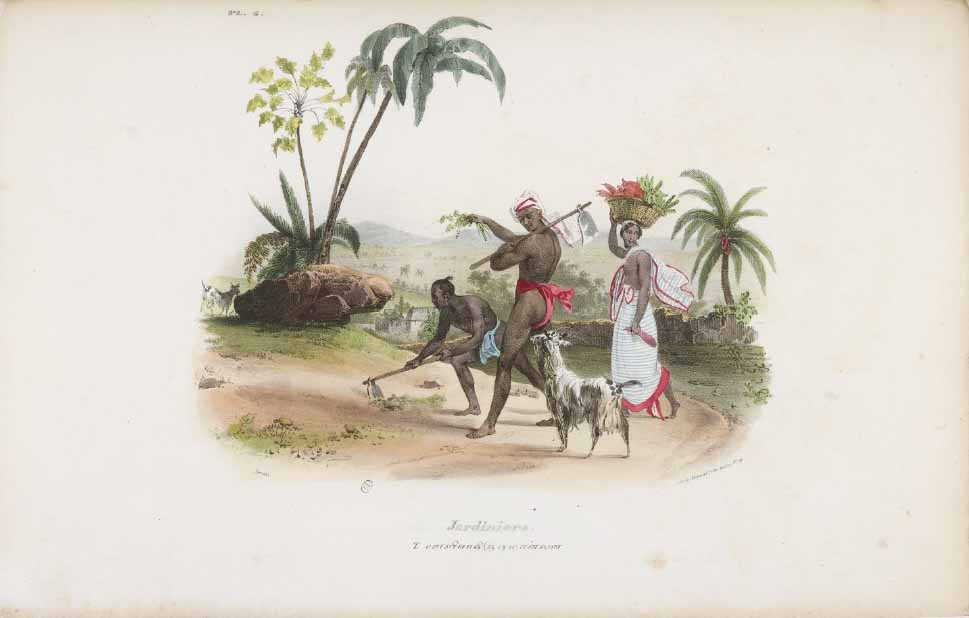

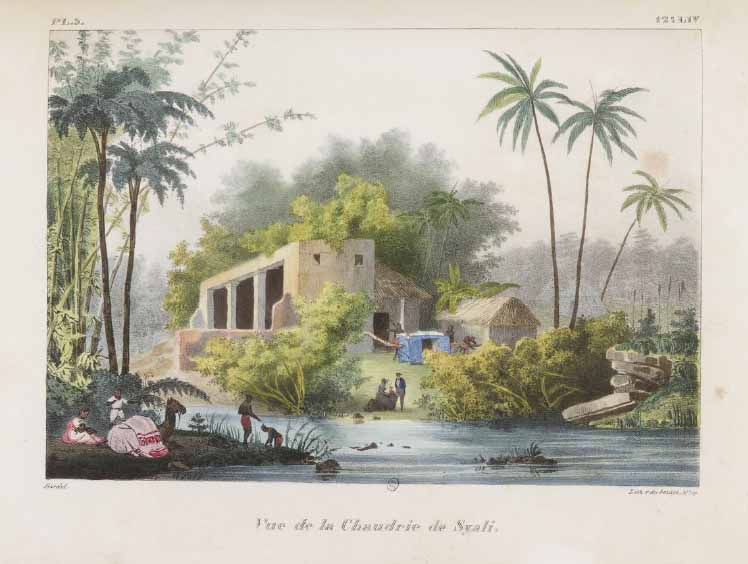

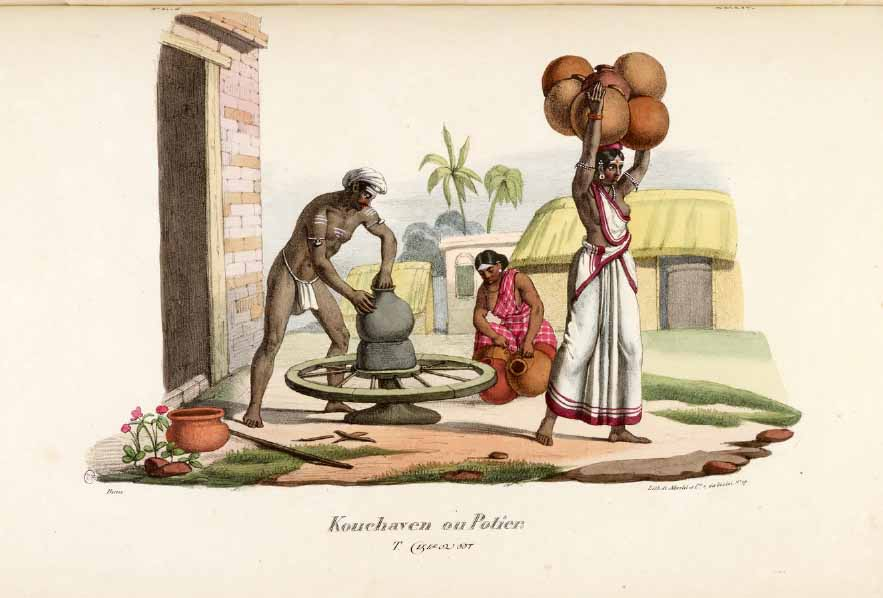
