= Émile-Louis Burnouf =

French orientalist and linguist

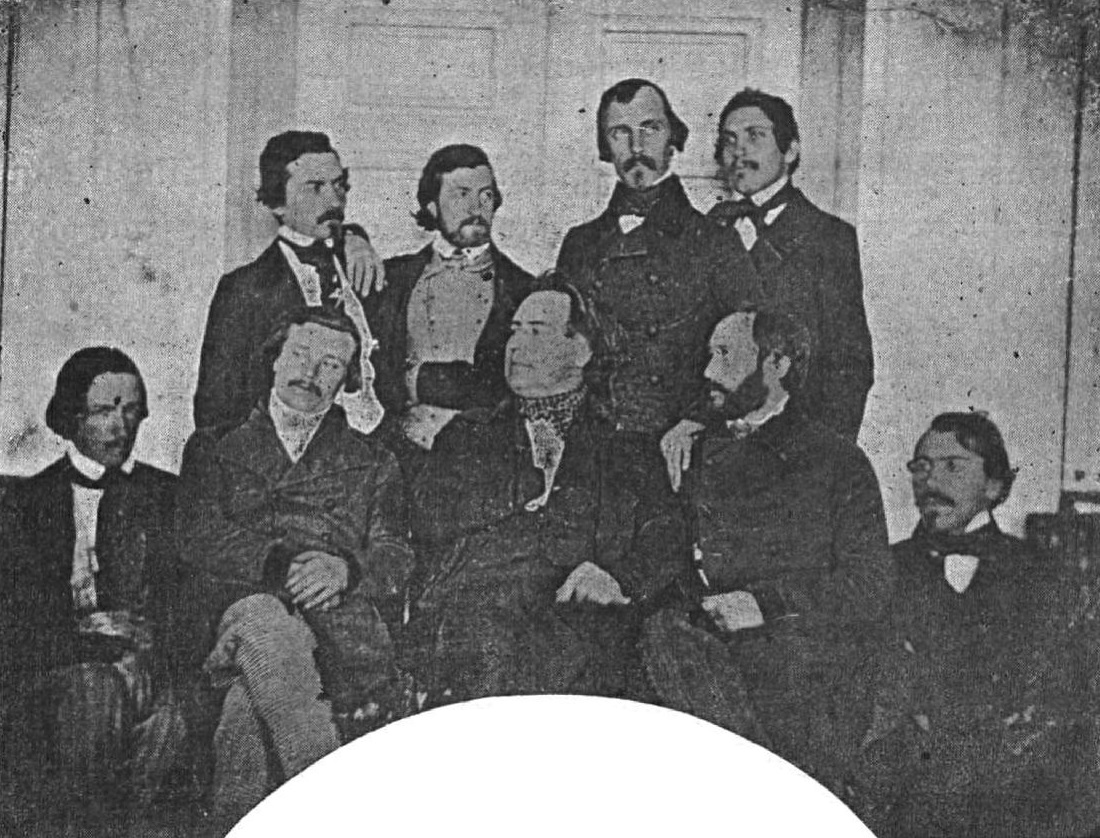
Daguerreotype of the first members of the French School at Athens, 1848. Burnouf is the second from left in the back row.

Émile-Louis Burnouf (French: [emil.lwi byʁnuf]; 26 August 1821, in Valognes – January 1907, in Paris) was a leading nineteenth-century Orientalist and racialist author of Aryanism. He was a professor at the faculté des lettres at Nancy University, then principal of the French School at Athens from 1867–1875. He was also the author of a Sanskrit-French dictionary.

== Biography ==
Émile was the nephew of Jean-Louis Burnouf, a famous philologist, and cousin of Eugène Burnouf, the founder of Buddhist studies in the West. Following in their footsteps, Émile sought to connect Buddhist and Hindu thought to Western European classical culture. In doing so, he claimed to have rediscovered the early Aryan belief-system.

Burnouf believed that only Aryan and Semitic peoples were truly religious in temperament.

Science has proved that the original tendency of the Aryan peoples is pantheism, while monotheism proper is the constant doctrine of Semitic populations. These are surely the two great beds in which flow the sacred stream of humanity. But the facts show is, in the West, peoples of Aryan origin in some sort Semiticised in Christianity. The whole of Europe is at once Aryan and Christian; that is to say pantheistic by its origin and natural dispositions, but accustomed to admit the dogma of creation from a Semitic influence.

Burnouf's work takes for granted a racial hierarchy that places Aryans at the top as a master race. His writings are also full of prejudicial and often deeply antisemitic statements. He believed that "real Semites" have smaller brains than Aryans:

A real Semite has smooth hair with curly ends, a strongly hooked nose, fleshy, projecting lips, massive extremities, thin calves and flat feet… His growth is very rapid, and at fifteen or sixteen it is over. At that age the divisions of the skull which contain the organs of intelligence are already joined, and that in some cases even perfectly welded together. From that period the growth of the brain is arrested. In the Aryan races this phenomenon, or anything like it, never occurs, at any time of life, certainly not with people of normal development. The internal organ is permitted to continue its evolution and transformations up until the very last day of life by means of the never-changing flexibility of the skull bone.

Burnouf believed that the Hebrew peoples were divided into two races, worshippers of Elohim and worshippers of Yahweh. The former were Semites, but the latter were "probably" Aryans, as "their headquarters were taken up north of Jerusalem, in Galilee. The people of that country again form a striking contrast to those of the south; they resemble Poles". The Galileans were in conflict with the more powerful Semitic priestly faction based in Jerusalem, explaining why Jesus was rejected by the Judeans but accepted by Greek speakers; Burnouf's ideas developed into the Nazi claim that Jesus was really Aryan.

Burnouf was consulted by Heinrich Schliemann (1822-1890) over his discovery of swastika motifs in the ruins of Troy. Burnouf claimed that swastika originated as a stylised depiction of a fire-altar seen from above, and was thus the essential symbol of the Aryan race. The popularisation of this idea in the twentieth century was mainly responsible for the adoption of the swastika in the West as an Aryan symbol. He died in 1907 aged 86.

== Works ==
- De Neptuno ejusque cultu, praesertim in Peloponneso, 1850, impr. de J. Delalain, 80 pp. (Il s’agit du texte de la Thèse complémentaire, en Latin, pour le doctorat ès-lettres auprès de la Faculté des lettres de Paris)
- Méthode pour étudier la langue sanskrite, 1859
- La Bhagavad-Gîtâ, ou le Chant du Bienheureux, poème indien, Paris, 1861.
- Essai sur le Veda, Paris: Dezobry, Fd Tandou et Cie, 1863
- Dictionnaire classique sanscrit-français (...) contenant le dêvanâgari, sa transcription européenne, l'interprétation, les racines, Nancy, 1863
- Histoire de la littérature grecque, 2 volumes, Ch. Delagrave, Paris, 1869
- La Légende athénienne, 1872
- La Mythologie japonaise, 1875
- La Science des religions. Maisonneuve. 1876. p. 1. "Emile Burnouf."
- La Ville et l'Acropole d'Athènes aux diverses époques, Maisonneuve, 1877
- Le Catholicisme contemporain, 1879
- Mémoires sur l'Antiquité, Maisonneuve et Cie, Paris, 1879
- La Vie et la pensée, 1886
