= Urville, Manche =

Urville
- Commune
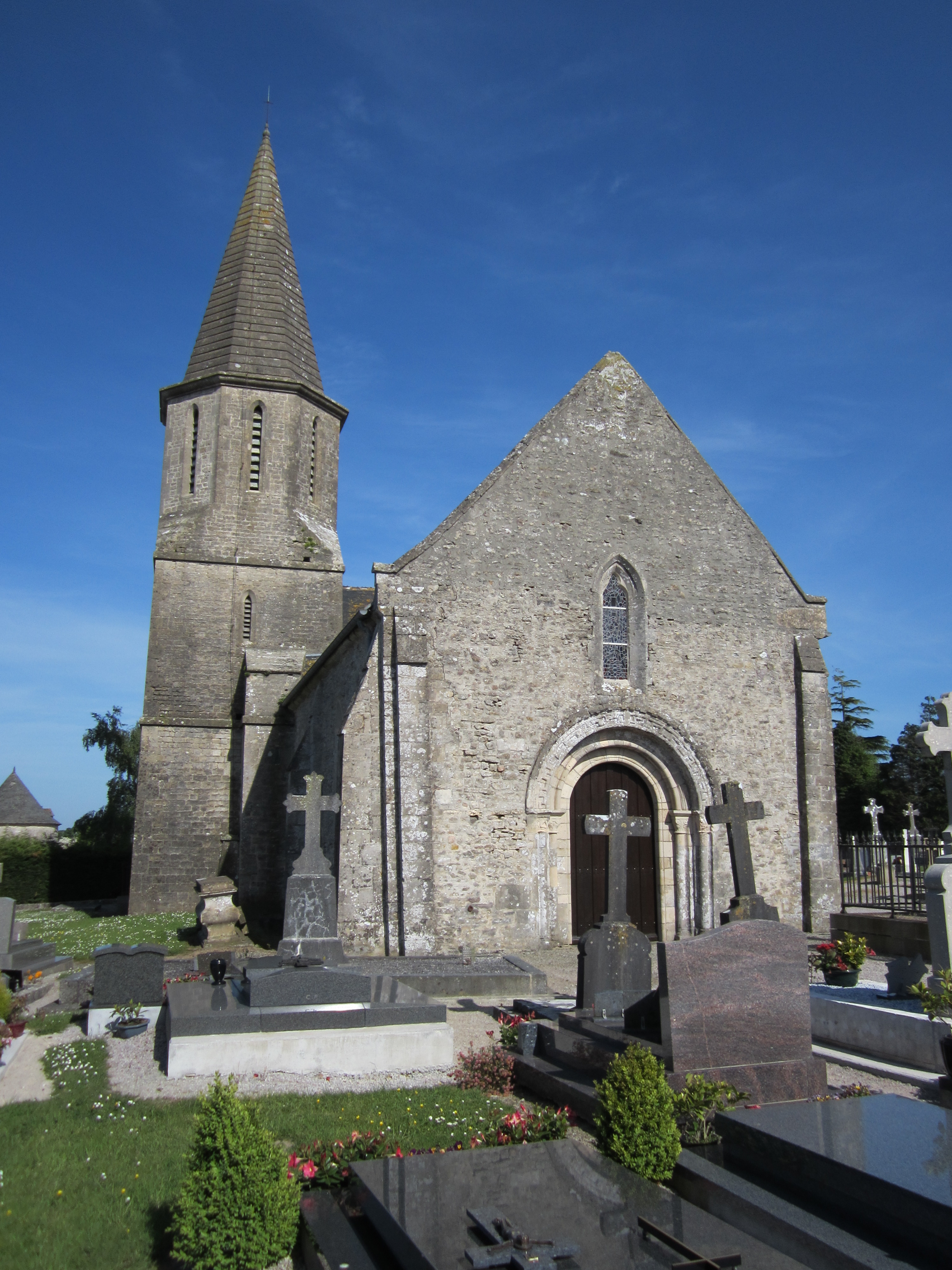
- The church of Saint-Julien
- Location of Urville
- Location within France Location within Normandy
- Coordinates: 49°27′08″N 1°25′58″W
- Country: France
- Region: Normandy
- Department: Manche
- Arrondissement: Cherbourg
- Canton: Valognes
- Intercommunality: CA Cotentin

Government
  - Mayor (2020–2026): Jean Lefauconnier
- Area^{1}: 5.15 km^{2} (1.99 sq mi)
- Elevation: 14 m (46 ft)
- Highest elevation: 33 m (108 ft)
- Lowest elevation: 6 m (20 ft)
- Population (2023): 190
  - Density: 37/km^{2} (96/sq mi)
- Time zone: UTC+01:00 (CET)
  - Summer (DST): UTC+02:00 (CEST)
- INSEE/Postal code: 50610 /50700
- ^{1} French Land Register data, which excludes lakes, ponds, glaciers > 1 km^{2} (0.386 sq mi or 247 acres) and river estuaries.

Urville (French pronunciation: [yʁvil]) is a commune in the Manche department in Normandy in north-western France.¨

== See also ==
- Communes of the Manche department
