= Corpus Christi Museum of Science and History =

Museum in Corpus Christi, Texas, US

Coordinates: 27°48′37″N 97°23′42″W

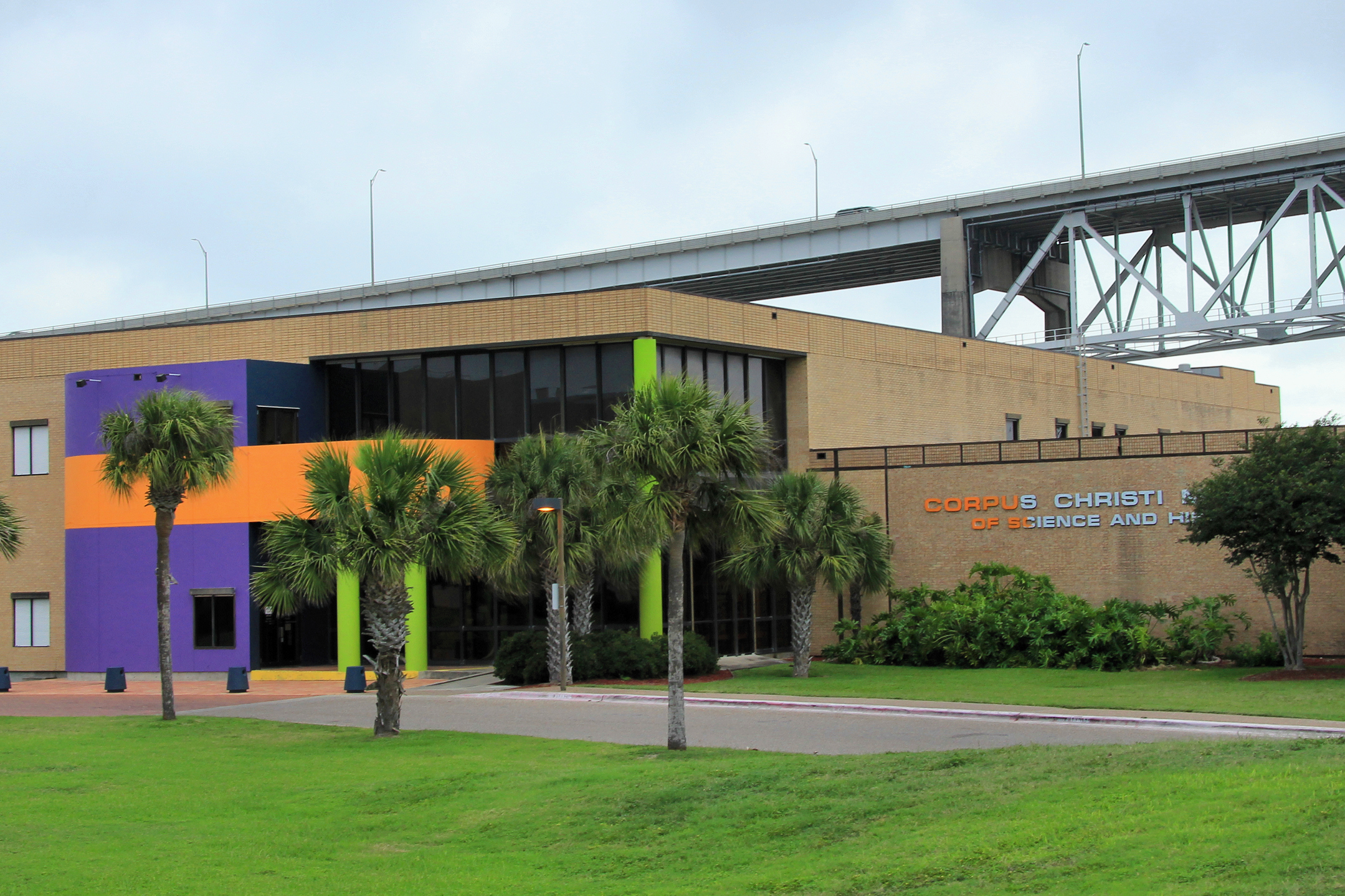
Corpus Christi Museum of Science and History

The Corpus Christi Museum of Science and History is a science and history museum in Corpus Christi, Texas, near Corpus Christi Harbor Bridge and the waterfront. It was established in 1957. Among its many displays covering an area of over 40,000 square feet are many artifacts found in the wreck of the Spanish ship San Estaban, including the world's oldest mariner's astrolabe with a confirmed date of 1554. An extension to the museum opened in May 1990 to house the Shipwreck! exhibition.
