= Eugène Burnouf =

French scholar and orientalist (1801–1852)

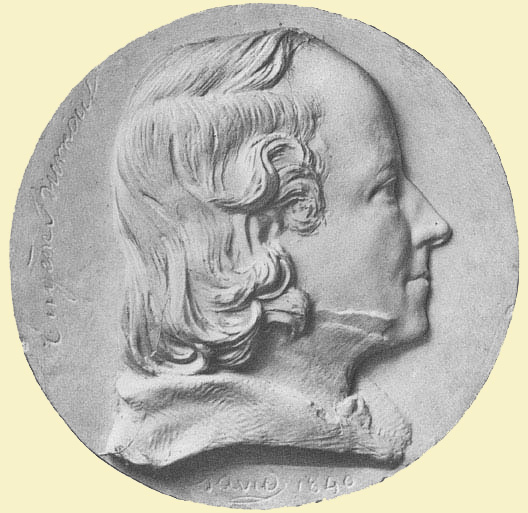
- Born: April 8, 1801; Paris, France
- Died: May 28, 1852 (aged 51)
- Occupation: Orientalist

Eugène Burnouf (French pronunciation: [øʒɛn byʁnuf]; April 8, 1801 – May 28, 1852) was a French scholar, an Indologist and orientalist. His notable works include a study of Sanskrit literature, translation of the Hindu text Bhagavata Purana and Buddhist text Lotus Sutra. He wrote a foundational text on Buddhism and also made significant contributions to the deciphering of Old Persian cuneiform.

== Life ==
He was born in Paris. His father, Professor Jean-Louis Burnouf (1775–1844), was a classical scholar of high reputate, and the author, among other works, of an excellent translation of Tacitus (6 vols., 1827–1833). Eugène Burnouf published in 1826 an Essai sur le Pali ..., written in collaboration with Christian Lassen; and in the following year Observations grammaticales sur quelques passages de l'essai sur le Pali.

The next great work he undertook was the deciphering of the Avesta manuscripts brought to France by Anquetil-Duperron. By his research a knowledge of the Avestan language was first brought into the scientific world of Europe. He caused the Vendidad Sade, to be lithographed with the utmost care from the manuscript in the Bibliothèque Nationale, and published it in folio parts, 1829–1843.

From 1833 to 1835 he published his Commentaire sur le Yaçna, l'un des livres liturgiques des Parses.

At about the same time in his life, Eugène Burnouf made significant contributions to the deciphering of Old Persian cuneiform. Copies of cuneiform inscriptions from Persepolis had been published by Carsten Niebuhr many years earlier in 1778 and some preliminary inferences had already been made by other scholars such as Georg Friedrich Grotefend about these Persian inscriptions. In 1836, Eugène Burnouf discovered that the first of the inscriptions contained a list of the satrapies of Darius. With this clue in his hand, he was able to identify and publish an alphabet of thirty letters, most of which he had correctly deciphered.

A month earlier, Burnouf's friend Professor Christian Lassen of Bonn, had also published a work on "The Old Persian Cuneiform Inscriptions of Persepolis". He and Burnouf had been in frequent correspondence, and (Burnouf's?) claim to have independently detected the names of the satrapies, and thereby to have fixed the values of the Persian characters, was in consequence fiercely attacked. However, whatever his obligations to Burnouf may have been, according to Sayce, Lassen's "contributions to the decipherment of the inscriptions were numerous and important."

A year later in 1837, Henry Rawlinson had made a copy of the much longer Behistun inscriptions in Persia. Carved in the reign of King Darius of Persia (522 BC–486 BC), the inscriptions consisted of identical texts in the three official languages of the empire: Old Persian, Babylonian, and Elamite. Rawlinson sent a translation of the opening paragraphs to the Royal Asiatic Society. Before this paper was published, however, the works of Lassen and Burnouf reached him, prompting a series of revisions and a delay in publication. In 1847 the first part of Rawlinson's Memoir was published, followed by the second part in 1849. The task of deciphering the Persian cuneiform texts was virtually accomplished.

Eugène Burnouf received many Sanskrit texts from Indologist and anthropologist Brian Houghton Hodgson. He published the Sanskrit text and French translation of the Bhagavata Purana ou histoire poétique de Krichna in three folio volumes (1840–1847). His last works were Introduction à l'histoire du Buddhisme indien (1844), and a translation of Le lotus de la bonne loi (The Lotus Sutra, 1852). According to Jonathan Silk, Burnouf can be regarded as "the founding father of modern Buddhist scientific studies."

He had been for twenty years a member of the Academie des Inscriptions and professor of Sanskrit in the Collège de France. "Introduction à l'Histoire du Bouddhisme Indien" is recognized as an introduction to Buddhist metaphysics which influenced many French occultists in the nineteenth century for whom indianism and Sanskrit texts were a source of inspiration.

See a notice of Burnouf's works by Barthélemy Saint-Hilaire, prefixed to the second edition (1876) of the Introduction à l'histoire du Buddhisme indien; also Naudet, Notice historique sur MM. Burnouf, père et fils, in Mémoires de l'Académie des Inscriptions. A list of his valuable contributions to the Journal asiatique and of his manuscript writings, is given in the appendix to the Choix de lettres d'Eugène Burnouf (1891).

His cousin Emile-Louis Burnouf (1821–1907) continued his work on Sanskrit language.

== Works ==
- Essai sur le Pali (1826)
- Vendidad Sade, l'un des livres de Zoroastre (1829–1843)
- Commentaire sur le Yaçna, l'un des livres liturgiques des Parses (1833–1835)
- Mémoire sur les inscriptions cunéiformes (1838)
- Bhâgavata Purâna ou histoire poétique de Krichna (3 volumes, 1840–1847)
- Introduction à l'histoire du Buddhisme indien (1844; 1876)
- Le Lotus de la bonne loi, traduit du sanscrit, accompagné d'un commentaire et de vingt et un mémoires relatifs au buddhisme (Paris, Imprimerie Nationale, 1852). Reprint: Librairie d'Amérique et d'Orient A. Maisonneuve, Paris, 1973.
- Aṣṭasāhasrikā Prajñāpāramitā, la Perfection de sagesse en huit mille stances, traduite par Eugène Burnouf (1801-1852), éditée par Guillaume Ducoeur, Université de Strasbourg, 2022.
- Eugène Burnouf (1801-1852) et les études indo-iranologiques, actes de la Journée d'étude d'Urville (28 mai 2022) suivis des Lalitavistara (chap. 1-2) et Kāraṇḍavyūha traduits par E. Burnouf, édités par Guillaume Ducoeur, Université de Strasbourg, 2022.
- Eugène Burnouf (in French) .

== See also ==
- L'Inde française
- List of works by Eugène Guillaume
