= Eckert projection =

Six pseudocylindrical map projections

The Eckert projections are six pseudocylindrical map projections devised by Max Eckert-Greifendorff, who presented them in 1906. The latitudes are parallel lines in all six projections. The projections come in pairs; in the odd-numbered projections, the latitudes are equally spaced, while their even-numbered counterparts are equal-area.

The three pairs are distinguished by the shapes of the meridians. Eckert I and Eckert II have rectilinear (straight-line) meridians, meeting at the equator at an angle. In Eckert III and Eckert IV, meridians are elliptical, while in Eckert V and Eckert VI, they are sinusoidal.
