= Winkel projection =

Map projections devised by Oswald Winkel

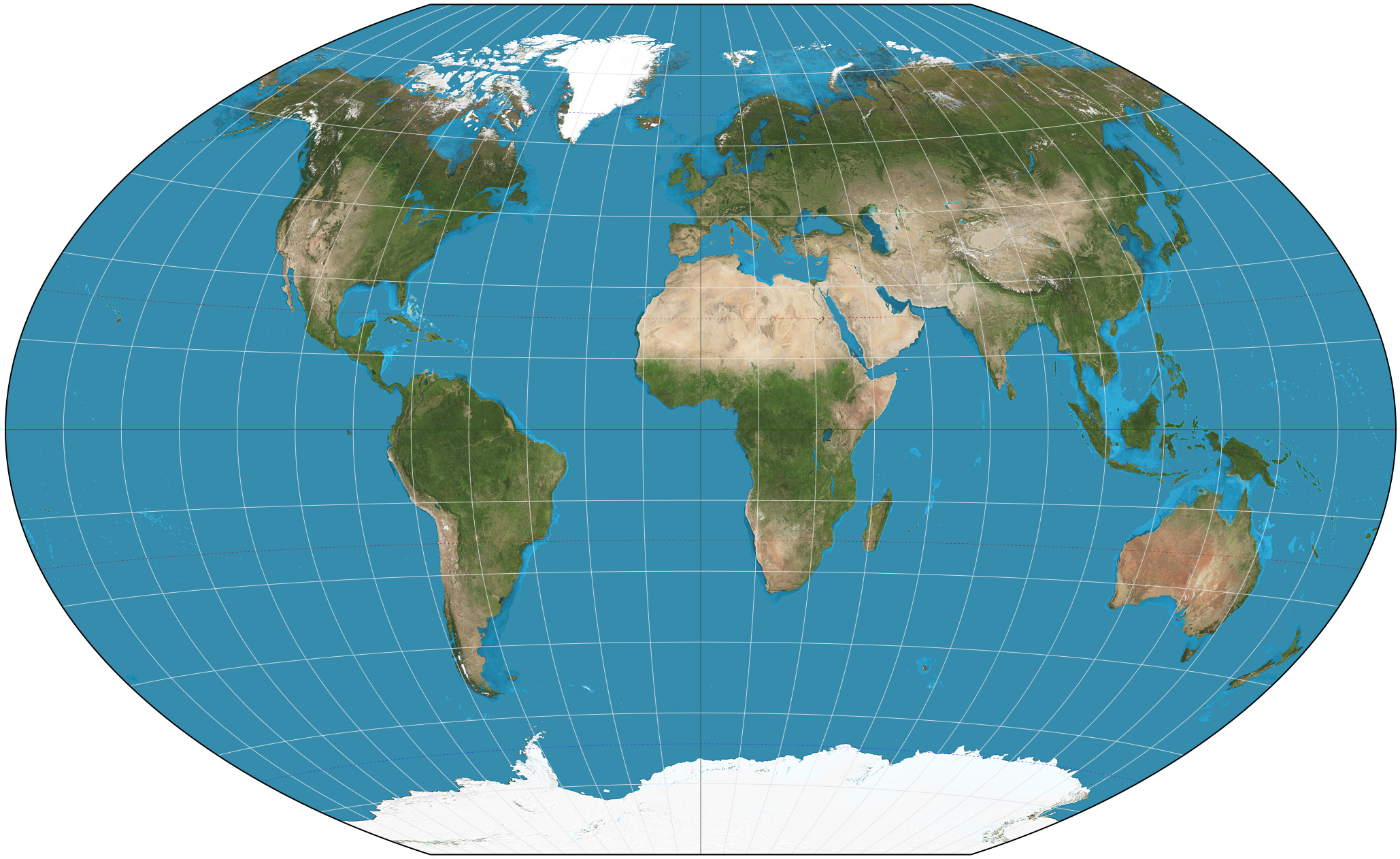
Winkel III projection of the world

The Winkel projection is a group of three map projections proposed in 1921 by the German cartographer Oswald Winkel (7 January 1874 – 18 July 1953).

Winkel projections use the arithmetic mean of the equirectangular projection and other projections. There are several variants: the Winkel I projection uses the sinusoidal projection, Winkel II uses the Mollweide projection, and Winkel Tripel (Winkel III) uses the Aitoff projection. Winkel I and II are pseudocylindrical projections, while Winkel III is an azimuthal projection. Of these three variants, the Winkel tripel projection is the most widely known.

== See also ==
- List of map projections
