= Wagner VI projection =

Pseudocylindrical compromise map projection

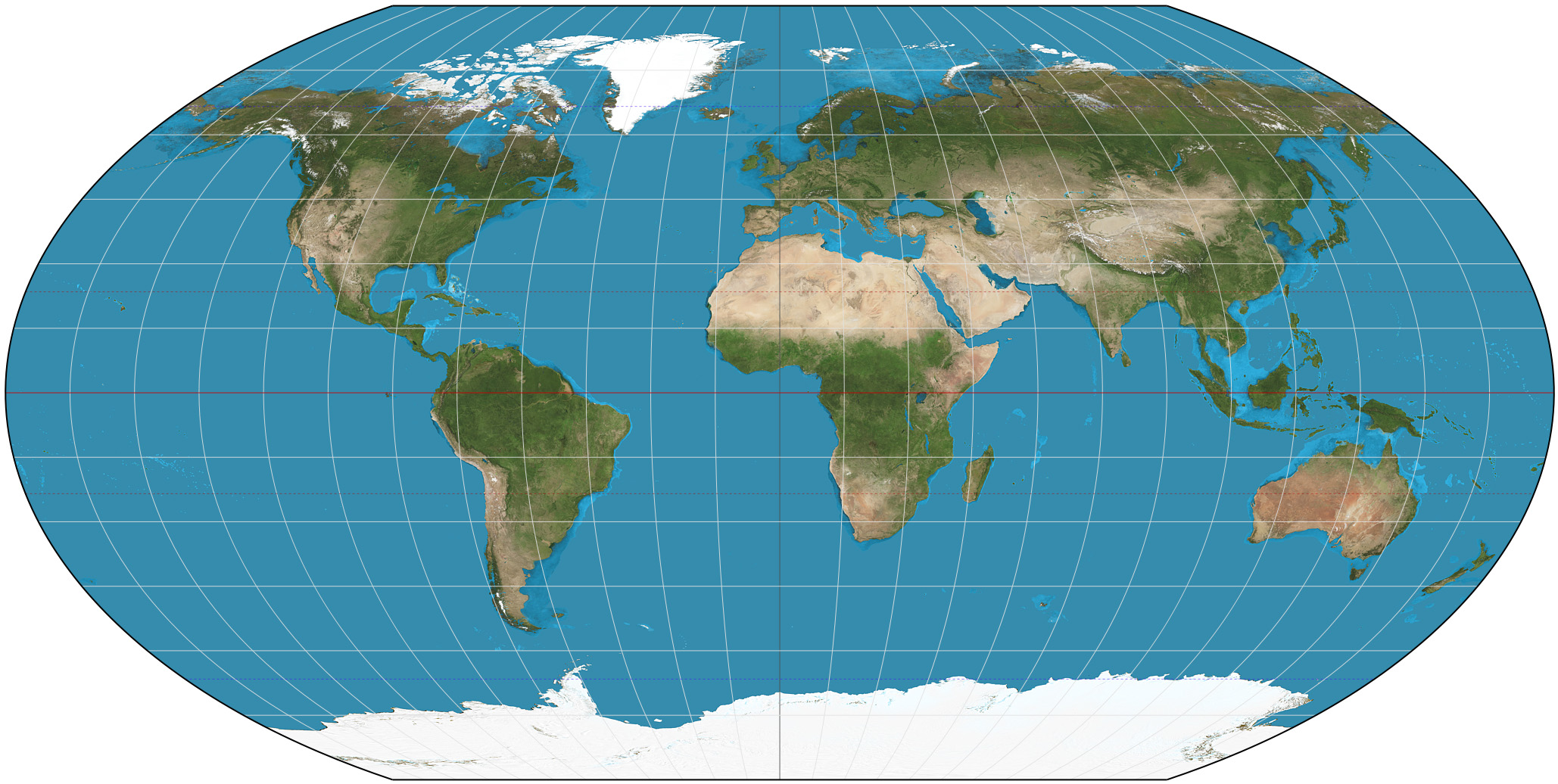
Wagner VI projection of the world

Wagner VI is a pseudocylindrical whole Earth map projection. Like the Robinson projection, it is a compromise projection, not having any special attributes other than a pleasing, low distortion appearance. Wagner VI is equivalent to the Kavrayskiy VII horizontally elongated by a factor of $2$/$\sqrt{3}$. This elongation results in proper preservation of shapes near the equator but slightly more distortion overall. The aspect ratio of this projection is 2:1, as formed by the ratio of the equator to the central meridian. This matches the ratio of Earth’s equator to any meridian.

The Wagner VI is defined by:

$$\begin{align} x &= \lambda \sqrt{1 - 3\left(\frac{\varphi}{\pi}\right)^2} \\ y &= \varphi \end{align}$$

where $\lambda$ is the longitude and $\varphi$ is the latitude.

Inverse formula:

$$\begin{align} \psi &= \arcsin\left({\frac{\sqrt{3}}{\pi}}y\right) \\ \lambda &= \frac{x}{\cos{\psi}} \\ \varphi &= y \end{align}$$

== See also ==
- List of map projections
- Cartography
- Kavrayskiy VII projection
- Robinson projection
