= Strebe 1995 projection =

Pseudoazimuthal equal-area map projection

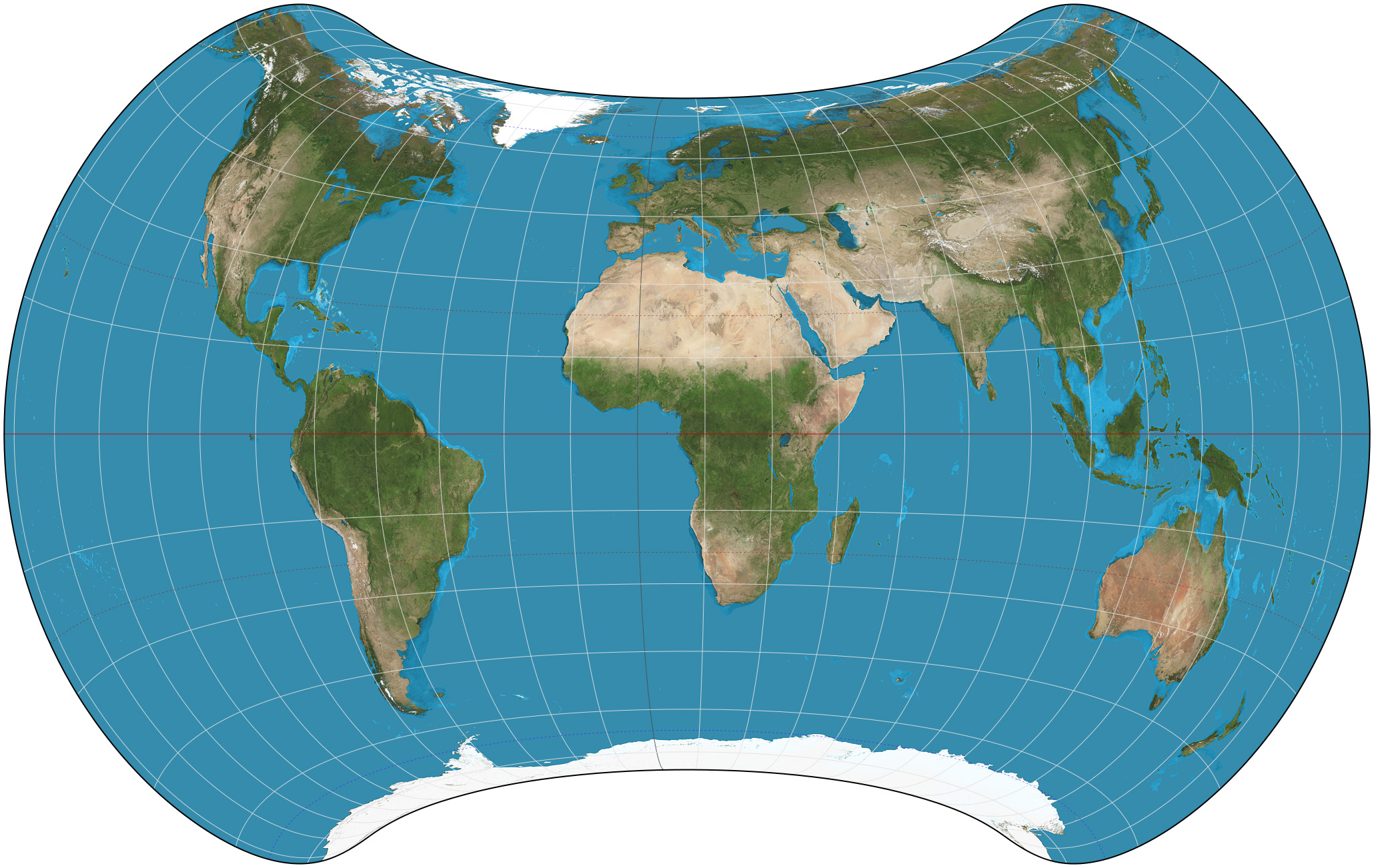
Strebe 1995 projection. 15° graticule, 11°E central meridian. Imagery is a derivative of NASA’s Blue Marble summer month composite with oceans lightened to enhance legibility and contrast. Image created with the Geocart map projection software.

The Strebe 1995 projection with Tissot's indicatrices of distortion. Circles spaced at 30° intervals.

The Strebe 1995 projection, Strebe projection, Strebe lenticular equal-area projection, or Strebe equal-area polyconic projection is an equal-area map projection presented by Daniel "daan" Strebe in 1994. Strebe designed the projection to keep all areas proportionally correct in size; to push as much of the inevitable distortion as feasible away from the continental masses and into the Pacific Ocean; to keep a familiar equatorial orientation; and to do all this without slicing up the map.

== Description ==
Strebe first presented the projection at a joint meeting of the Canadian Cartographic Association and the North American Cartographic Information Society (NACIS) in August 1994. Its final formulation was completed in 1995. The projection has been available in the map projection software Geocart since Geocart 1.2, released in October 1994.

The projection is arrived at by a series of steps, each of which preserves areas. Because each step preserves areas, the entire process preserves areas. The steps use a technique invented by Strebe called "substitute deprojection" or "Strebe's transformation". First, the Eckert IV projection is computed. Then, pretending that the Eckert projection is actually a shrunken portion of the Mollweide projection, the Eckert is "deprojected" back onto the sphere using the inverse transformation of the Mollweide projection. This yields a full-sphere-to-partial-sphere map. Then this mapped sphere is projected back to the plane using the Hammer projection. While the projections named here are the ones that define the Strebe 1995 projection, the substitute deprojection principle is not constrained to particular projections.

The projection as described can be formulated as follows:

$$\begin{align}
x &= \frac {2D}{s} \cos \varphi_{\text{p}} \sin \lambda_{\text{p}} , \quad
y = s D \sin \varphi_{\text{p}} \\
s &= 1.35 \\
D &= \sqrt {\frac {2}{1 + \cos \varphi_{\text{p}} \cos \lambda_{\text{p}}}} \\
\sin \varphi_{\text{p}} &= \frac {2 \arcsin \frac{\sqrt{2} y_{\text{e}}}{2} + r y_{\text{e}}}{\pi} \\
\lambda_{\text{p}} &= \frac {\pi x_{\text{e}}}{4r} \\
r &= \sqrt {2 - y_{\text{e}}^2} \\
x_{\text{e}} &= s \frac {\lambda (1+\cos \theta)}{\sqrt {4\pi + \pi^2}} , \quad
y_{\text{e}} = 2 \frac {\sqrt \pi \sin \theta}{s \sqrt {4+\pi}},
\end{align}$$

where $\theta$ is solved iteratively:

$$\begin{align}
\theta + \sin \theta \cos \theta + 2 \sin \theta &= \frac{1}{2} \left(4+\pi\right) \sin \varphi .
\end{align}$$

In these formulae, $\lambda$ represents longitude and $\varphi$ represents latitude.

Strebe's preferred arrangement is to set $s = 1.35$, as shown, and 11°E as the central meridian to avoid dividing eastern Siberia's Chukchi Peninsula. However, s can be modified to change the appearance without destroying the equal-area property.

== See also ==
- List of map projections
