= Eckert-Greifendorff projection =

Map projection by Max Eckert-Greifendorff

The Eckert-Greifendorff projection is an equal-area map projection described by Max Eckert-Greifendorff in 1935. Unlike his previous six projections, it is not pseudocylindrical.

== Development ==
Directly inspired by the Hammer projection, Eckert-Greifendorff suggested the use of the equatorial form of the Lambert azimuthal equal-area projection instead of Aitoff's use of the azimuthal equidistant projection:
$$\begin{align} x &= 2\operatorname{laea}_x\left(\frac{\lambda}{4}, \varphi\right) \\
y &= \tfrac12 \operatorname{laea}_y\left(\frac{\lambda}{4}, \varphi\right) \end{align}$$
where laea_{x} and laea_{y} are the x and y components of the equatorial Lambert azimuthal equal-area projection. Written out explicitly:
$$\begin{align} x &= \frac{4 \sqrt 2 \cos \varphi \sin \frac{\lambda}{4}}{\sqrt{1 + \cos \varphi \cos \frac{\lambda}{4}}} \\
y &= \frac{\sqrt 2\sin \varphi}{\sqrt{1 + \cos \varphi \cos \frac{\lambda}{4}}} \end{align}$$

The inverse is calculated with the intermediate variable
$$z \equiv \sqrt{1 - \left(\tfrac1{16} x\right)^2 - \left(\tfrac12 y\right)^2}$$

The longitude and latitudes can then be calculated by
$$\begin{align}
\lambda &= 4 \arctan \frac{zx}{4\left(2z^2 - 1\right)} \\
\varphi &= \arcsin zy
\end{align}$$
where λ is the longitude from the central meridian and φ is the latitude.

== See also ==
- List of map projections
- Hammer projection
- Eckert projection
