= Gall stereographic projection =

Cylindrical compromise map projection

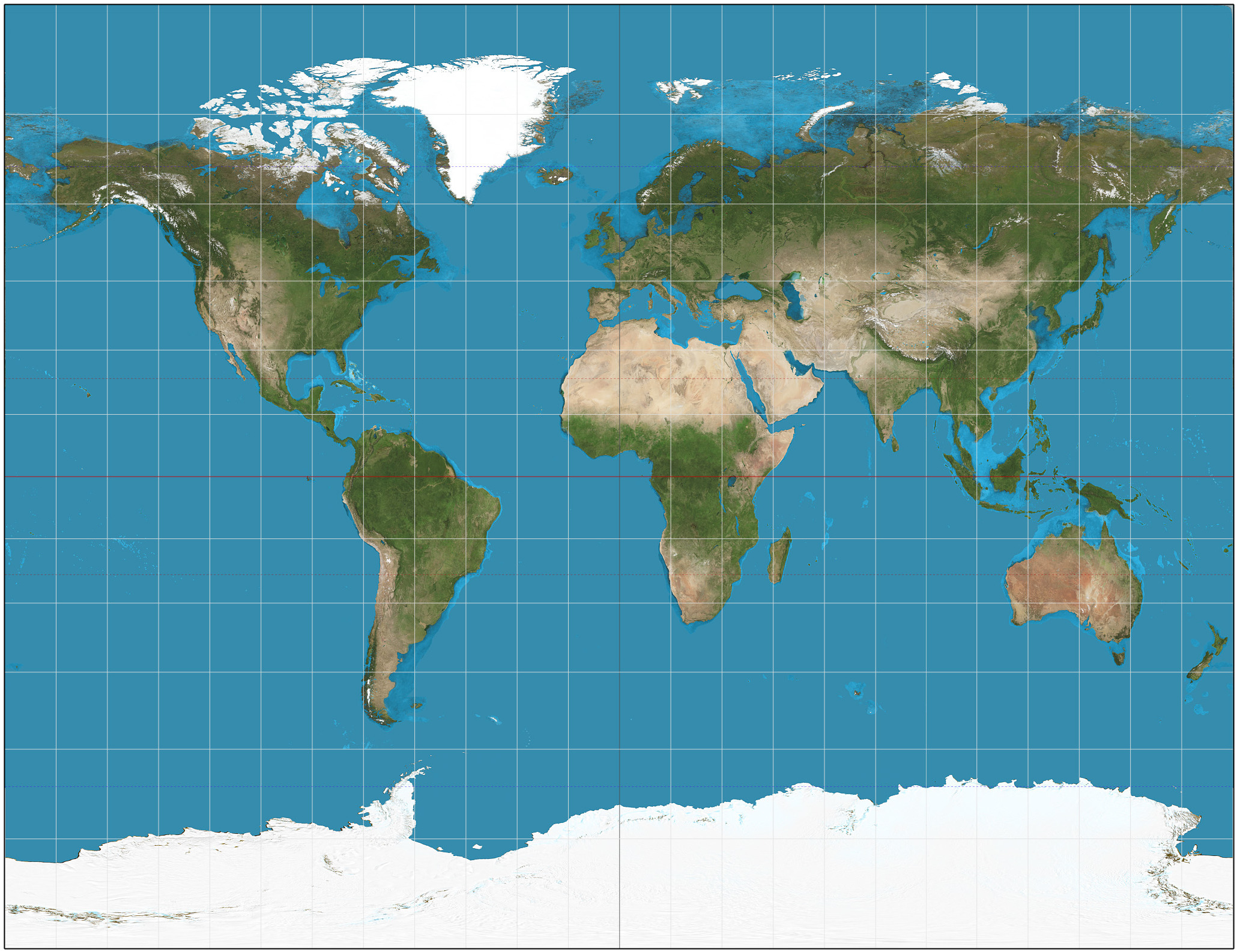
Gall stereographic projection of the world. 15° graticule.

Gall stereographic projection with 1,000 km indicatrices of distortion.

The Gall stereographic projection, presented by James Gall in 1855, is a cylindrical projection. It is neither equal-area nor conformal but instead tries to balance the distortion inherent in any projection. It distorts sizes less than the Mercator projection does, and distorts shapes less than an equirectangular projection does.

== Formulae ==
The projection is conventionally defined as:
$$x = \frac{R\lambda}{\sqrt 2}\, ; \quad y = R \left(1+\frac{\sqrt 2}{2}\right)\tan \frac{\varphi}{2}$$
where λ is the longitude from the central meridian in degrees, φ is the latitude, and R is the radius of the globe used as the model of the earth for projection. It is a perspective projection if the point of projection is allowed to vary with longitude: the point of projection being on the equator on the opposite side of the earth from the point being mapped and with the projective surface being a cylinder secant to the sphere at 45°N and 45°S. Gall called the projection "stereographic" because the spacing of the parallels is the same as the spacing of the parallels along the central meridian of the equatorial stereographic projection.

The reverse projection is defined as :
$$\lambda = \frac{x \sqrt 2}{R} ; \quad \varphi = 2 \arctan \frac{y}{R \left(1+\frac{\sqrt 2}{2}\right)}$$

== Braun stereographic projection ==
This later (1867) cylindrical projection by Carl Braun is similar, differing only in the asymmetric scaling horizontally and vertically. This yields a projection tangent to the sphere. Its formula is:
$$x = R\lambda\, ; \quad y = 2 R \tan \frac{\varphi}{2}$$

== See also ==
- List of map projections
- Gall-Peters projection

== Bibliography ==
- Snyder, John P (1993). Flattening the Earth. University of Chicago Press. ISBN 978-0-226-76747-5.
