= Gall isographic projection =

Map projection

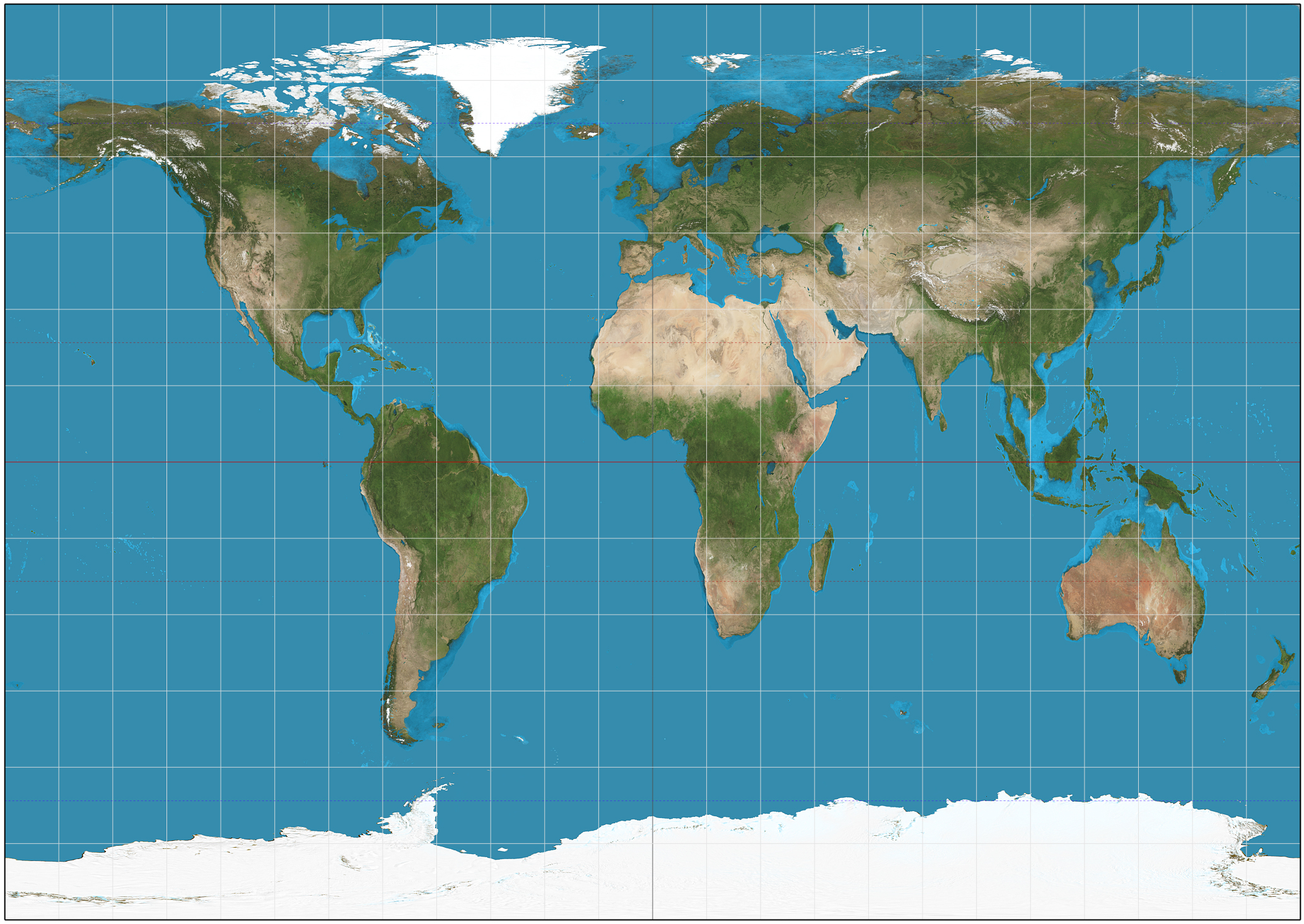
Gall isographic projection. 15° graticule.

Gall isographic projection is a specific instance of equirectangular projection such that its standard parallels are north and south 45°. The projection is named after James Gall, who presented it in 1855.

== See also ==
- Gall–Peters projection
- Gall stereographic projection
