= Strebe =

Strebe may refer to:

- German for strut, type of structural component
- Strėva (called "Strebe" in German), river in Lithuania
  - Battle of Strėva, 1348 battle along the river
- Bert Strebe, German journalist and author
- Daniel Strebe, cartographer
  - Strebe 1995 projection, equal-area map projection proposed by Daniel Strebe
