= Vladimir Kavrayskiy =

Russian and Soviet cartographer, astronomer and geodesist (1884–1954)

- Born: Vladimir Vladimirovich Kavrayskiy; 22 April 1884; Simbirsk Governorate, Russian Empire
- Died: 26 February 1954 (aged 69); Leningrad, RSFSR, Soviet Union
- Citizenship: Soviet
- Scientific career
- Fields: Geodesy, astronomy, cartography

Vladimir Vladimirovich Kavrayskiy (Russian: Владимир Владимирович Каврайский; April 22, 1884 – February 26, 1954) was a Soviet astronomer, geodesist and cartographer.

== Scientific research ==
In 1939, he invented the Kavrayskiy VII projection.

Kavrayskiy produced a lifetime of scientific works devoted to the solution of navigation problems.

== Namesakes ==
The Kavrayskiy Hills in the Antarctic are named after him.

The hydrographic survey vessel Vladimir Kavrayskiy was named after him.

== Awards and honors ==
- Two Orders of the Red Banner (1944, 1947)
- Order of the Red Banner of Labour (1944)
- Order of Lenin (1945)
- Stalin Prize, 3rd class (1952)

== See also ==
- Kavrayskiy VII projection
