= Kavrayskiy VII projection =

Pseudocylindrical compromise map projection

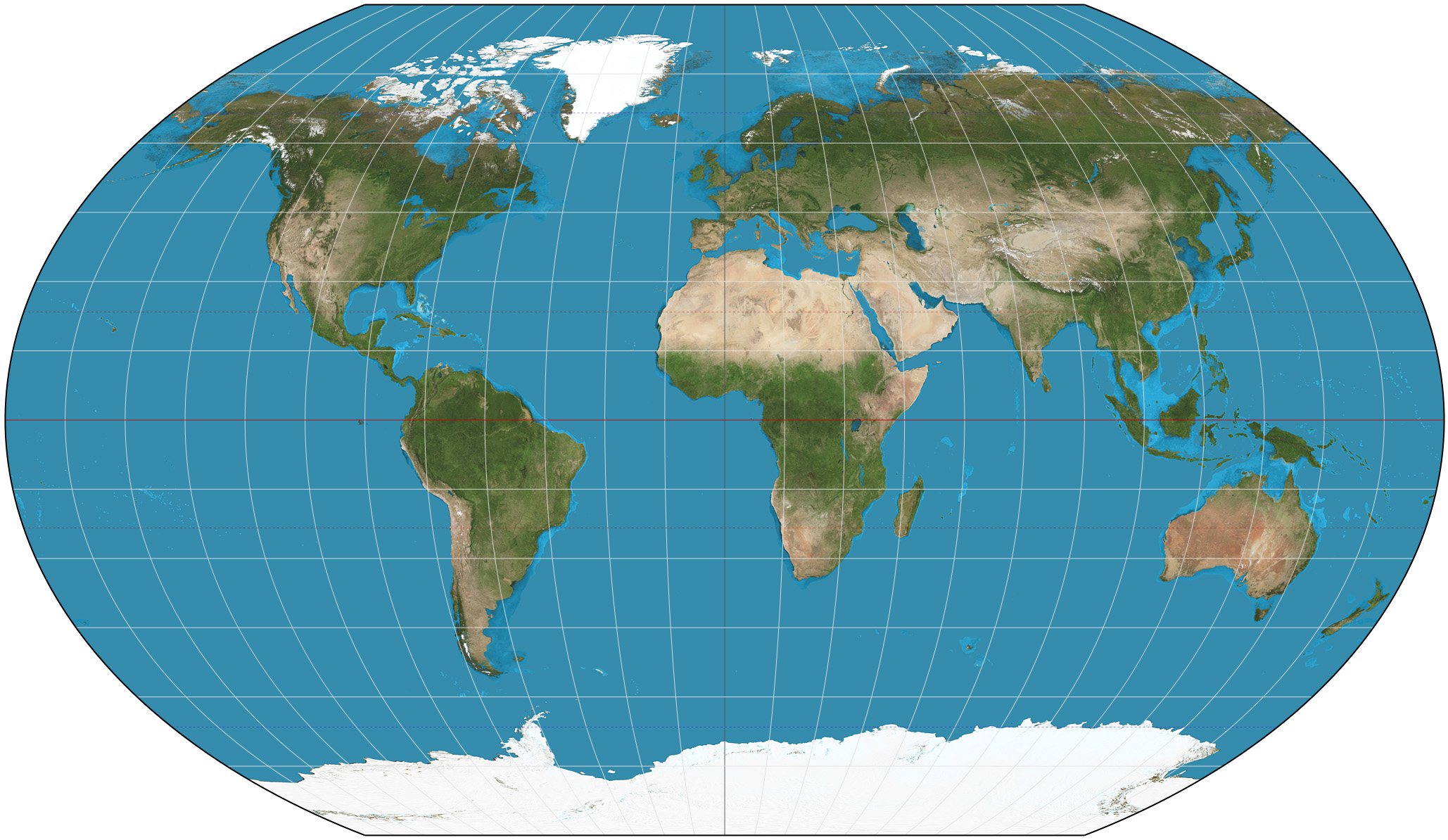
Kavrayskiy VII projection of the Earth

The Kavrayskiy VII projection with Tissot's indicatrix of deformation

The Kavrayskiy VII projection is a map projection invented by Soviet cartographer Vladimir V. Kavrayskiy in 1939 for use as a general-purpose pseudocylindrical projection. It is a compromise projection intended to produce good-quality maps with low distortion overall, similar in purpose to the later Robinson projection. It scores well in that respect compared to other popular projections, such as the Winkel tripel, despite straight, evenly spaced parallels and a simple formulation. Regardless, it has not been widely used outside the former Soviet Union.

The projection is defined as

$$\begin{align}
x &= \frac{3 \lambda}{2} \sqrt{\frac{1}{3} - \left(\frac{\varphi}{\pi}\right)^2} \\
y &= \varphi
\end{align}$$

where $\lambda$ is the longitude, and $\varphi$ is the latitude in radians.

The inverse would then be
$$\begin{align}
\varphi &= y \\
\lambda &= \frac{2 x}{3 \sqrt{\frac{1}{3} - \left(\frac{y}{\pi}\right)^2}}
\end{align}$$

== See also ==
- List of map projections
- Cartography
- Wagner VI projection
