= Vladimir Kavrayskiy (ship) =

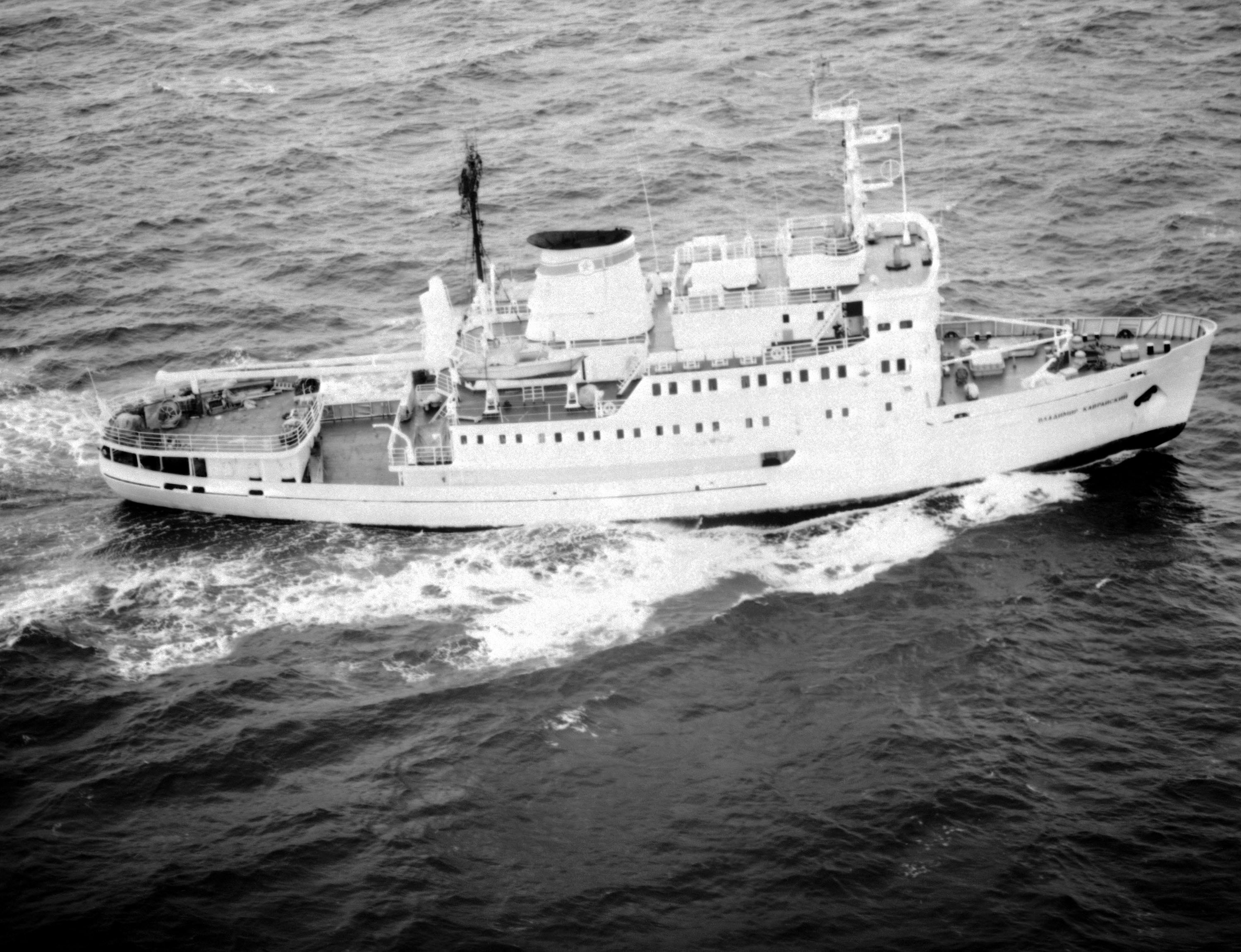
- Vladimir Kavrayskiy photographed on 9 April 1992

History

→ Soviet Union → Russia
- Name: Vladimir Kavrayskiy (1969–2012); PKZ-86 (2012–present)
- Namesake: Vladimir Kavrayskiy
- Operator: Northern Fleet
- Builder: Admiralty Shipyard (Leningrad, USSR)
- Yard number: 779
- Laid down: 25 February 1969
- Launched: 31 October 1969
- Completed: 31 December 1969
- In service: 1969–present
- Status: Stationary barracks ship in Murmansk

General characteristics
- Type: Hydrographic survey vessel
- Displacement: 3,450 t (3,400 long tons)
- Length: 70.1 m (230 ft)
- Beam: 18.1 m (59 ft)
- Draught: 6.4 m (21.0 ft)
- Installed power: 3 × 13D100 (3 × 1,800 hp)
- Propulsion: Diesel-electric; three shafts (2 × 2,400 hp + 1,600 hp)
- Speed: 15 knots (28 km/h; 17 mph)
- Range: 13,100 nautical miles (24,300 km; 15,100 mi)
- Endurance: 60 days
- Complement: 63 crew; 17 scientists
- Aviation facilities: Helideck

Vladimir Kavrayskiy (Russian: Владимир Каврайский) is a former Soviet and later Russian Navy icebreaking hydrographic survey vessel today used as a floating barracks PKZ-86 in Murmansk.

== Description ==
In the mid-1950s, the Soviet Union began developing a new diesel-electric icebreaker design based on the 1942-built steam-powered icebreaker Eisbär to meet the needs of both civilian and naval operators. Built in various configurations until the early 1980s, the Project 97 icebreakers and their derivatives became the largest and longest-running class of icebreakers and icebreaking vessels built in the world. Of the 32 ships built in total, the single-vessel Project 97B subclass featured a longer hull, additional facilities for hydrographic surveys, increased accommodation, and a helipad.

Vladimir Kavrayskiy is 70.1 metres (230 ft) long overall and has a beam of 18.1 metres (59 ft). Fully laden, the vessels draws 6.4 metres (21.0 ft) of water and has a displacement of 3,450 tonnes (3,400 long tons). Its three 1,800-horsepower (1,300 kW) 10-cylinder 13D100 two-stroke opposed-piston diesel engines are coupled to generators that powered electric propulsion motors driving two propellers in the stern and a third one in the bow.

Compared to baseline Project 97 icebreakers, Project 97B has a longer hull and greater displacement providing increased range and autonomy time. Furthermore, the vessel is fitted for hydrographic surveys with additional scientific facilities and accommodation for additional crew and 17 scientific personnel.

== History ==
Vladimir Kavrayskiy was laid down at Admiralty Shipyard in Leningrad on 25 February 1969, launched on 31 October 1969, and delivered on 31 December 1969. The vessel was named after Vladimir Vladimirovich Kavrayskiy (1884–1954), a Soviet astronomer, geodesist and cartographer. The vessel entered service with the separate division of oceanographic research vessels of the hydrographic service of the Northern Fleet.

During its service as a hydrographic survey vessel, Vladimir Kavrayskiy completed 37 expedition voyages and covered a distance of 380,000 nautical miles (700,000 km; 440,000 mi).

Following the dissolution of the Soviet Union, Vladimir Kavrayskiy was passed over to the Russian Navy on 26 July 1992.

In July 2011, Vladimir Kavrayskiy was reassigned to the detachment of support vessels of the Northern Fleet and renamed PKZ-86 in the following spring. As of 2023, the vessel remains in service as a stationary barracks ship in Murmansk.
