= Max Eckert-Greifendorff =

German geographer

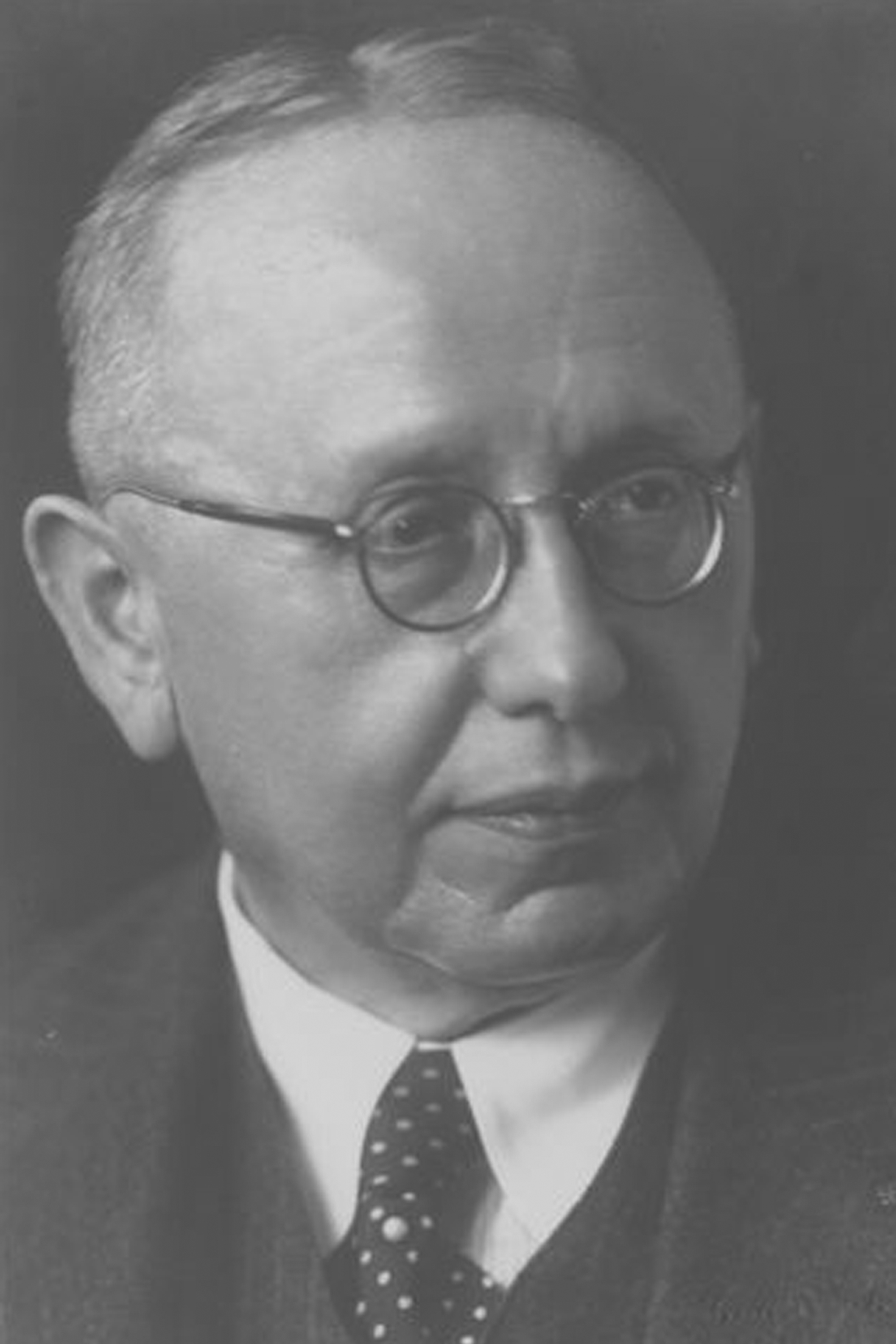
Max Eckert-Greifendorff, 1935

Friedrich Eduard Max Eckert (after 1934, Friedrich Eduard Max Eckert-Greifendorff: 10 April 1868 in Chemnitz, Kingdom of Saxony – 26 December 1938, in Aachen, Rhine Province) was a German geographer.

== Biography ==
He received his education in Löbau and Berlin, and taught for some time at Löbau and Leipzig. In 1903, he became Privatdozent at Kiel University. In 1907, he was appointed to the chair of geography in the Royal Technical High School of Aachen (Aix-la-Chapelle). He invented the six Eckert projections and others such as Eckert-Greifendorff projection

== Writings ==
He has published Schulatlas (School atlas, 45th ed., 1912), Wesen und Aufgabe der Wirtschafts- und Verkehrsgeographie (Essentials and purpose of economic and transportation geography, 1903), Grundriss der Handelsgeographie (Fundamentals of the geography of trade, 1905), Leitfaden der Handelsgeographie (Primer of the geography of trade, 3d ed., 1911), Neue Entwürfe für Erdkarten (New ideas for world maps, 1906), Die Kartographie als Wissenschaft (Cartography as a discipline, 1907), The New Fields of Geography, especially Commercial Geography (1907), Geographisches Praktikum, with Otto Krümmel (Geography in practice, 1908), Fortschritt in der geographischen Erschliessung unsern Kolonien (1908 et seq.), Die Kartenprojektion (Map projections, 1910), Deutsche Kulturgeographie (German cultural geography, 1912), Wirtschaftsatlas der deutschen Kolonien (Economic atlas of the German colonies, 1912), Die wirtschaftliche Bedeutung des Panama-Kanals (The economic significance of the Panama Canal, 1913), Die Metallverbreitung und Metallgewerbe der Welt (World metal trade and distribution, 1913).

== See also ==
- Eckert II projection
- Eckert IV projection
- Eckert VI projection

== Notes ==
Max Eckert's Kartenwissenschaft—the turning point in German cartography, Wolfgang Scharfe, Imago Mundi, Vol. 38, Iss. 1, 1986 Taylor and Francis Online (paywall)
