= Wiechel projection =

Pseudoazimuthal, equal-area map projection

Wiechel Projection of the Earth

The Wiechel projection is an pseudoazimuthal, equal-area map projection, and a novelty map presented by William H. Wiechel in 1879. When centered on the pole, it has semicircular meridians arranged in a pinwheel. Distortion of direction, shape, and distance is considerable in the edges.

In polar aspect, the Wiechel projection can be expressed as so:

$$\begin{align}x &= R \left( \sin \lambda \cos \phi - \left( 1 - \sin \phi \right) \cos \lambda \right), \\
y &= -R \left( \cos \lambda \cos \phi + \left( 1 - \sin \phi \right) \sin \lambda \right).
\end{align}$$

The Wiechel can be obtained via an area-preserving polar transformation of the Lambert azimuthal equal-area projection. In polar representation, the required transformation is of the form

$$\begin{align}r_{W} &= r_L, \\
\theta_W &= \theta_L - \frac{1}{2} \arcsin r_L,
\end{align}$$

where $(r_L,\theta_{L})$ and $(r_W,\theta_W)$ are the polar coordinates of the Lambert and Wiechel maps, respectively. The determinant of the Jacobian of the transformation is equal to unity, ensuring that it is area-preserving. The Wiechel map thus serves as a simple example that equal-area projections of the sphere onto the disk are not unique, unlike conformal maps which follow the Riemann mapping theorem.

== See also ==
- Lambert azimuthal equal-area projection
