= Eckert II projection =

Pseudocylindrical equal-area map projection

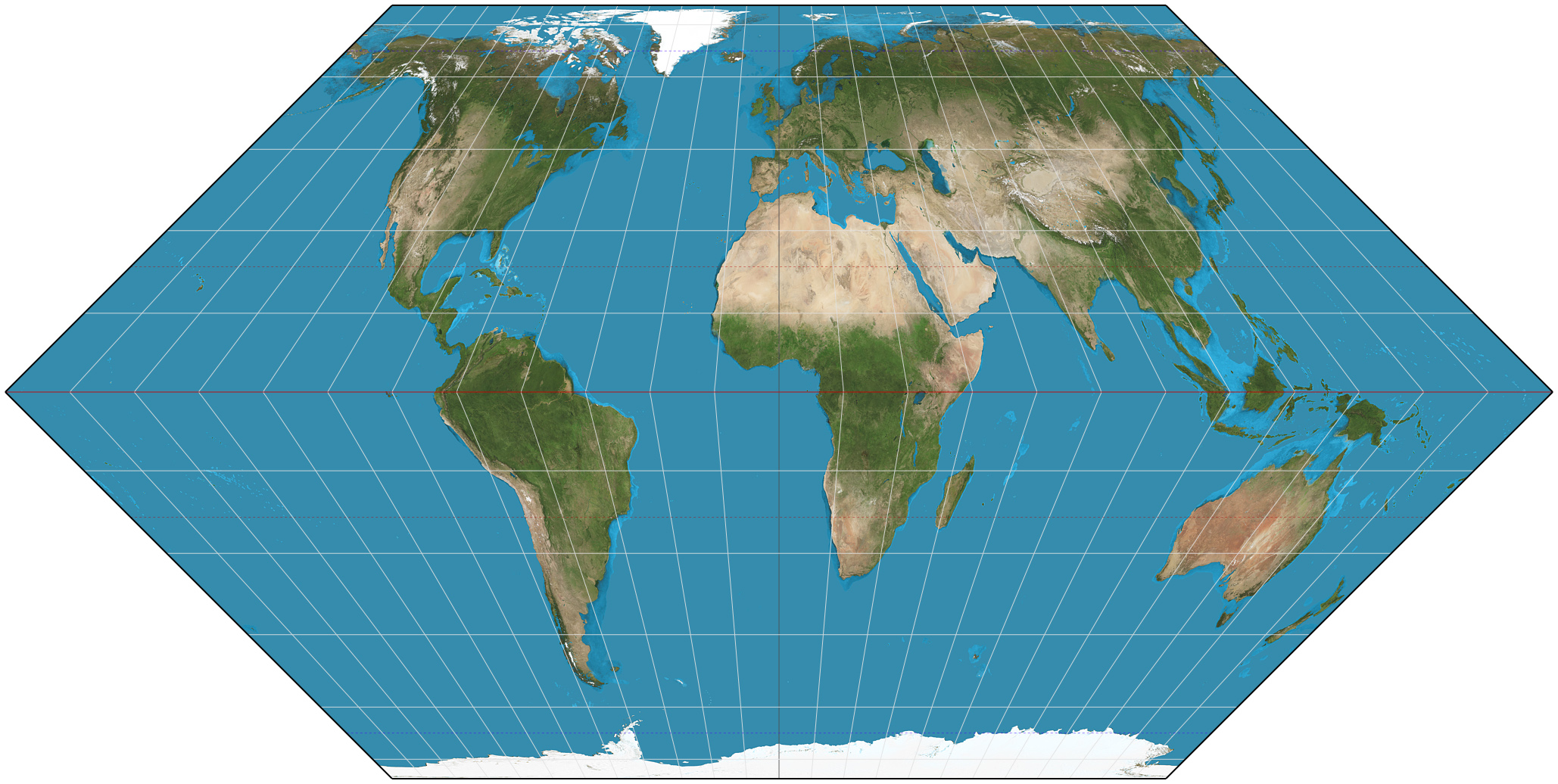
Eckert II projection of the world

The Eckert II projection is an equal-area pseudocylindrical map projection. In the equatorial aspect (where the equator is shown as the horizontal axis) the network of longitude and latitude lines consists solely of straight lines, and the outer boundary has the distinctive shape of an elongated hexagon. It was first described by Max Eckert in 1906 as one of a series of three pairs of pseudocylindrical projections. Within each pair, the meridians have the same shape, and the odd-numbered projection has equally spaced parallels, whereas the even-numbered projection has parallels spaced to preserve area. The pair to Eckert II is the Eckert I projection.

== Description ==
The projection is symmetrical about the straight equator and straight central meridian. Parallels vary in spacing in order to preserve areas. As a pseudocylindrical projection, spacing of meridians along any given parallel is constant. The poles are represented as lines, each half as long as the equator. The projection has correct scale only on the central meridian at latitudes 55°10′ north and south.

The projection's x and y coordinates can be computed as
$$\begin{align}
x &= 2 R \left(\lambda - \lambda_0 \right) \sqrt{\frac{4-3\sin|\varphi|}{6\pi}} \\
y &= R \sqrt{\frac{2 \pi}{3}} \left(2 - \sqrt{4 - 3 \sin |\varphi|}\right)
\end{align}$$
where λ is the longitude, λ_{0} is the central meridian, φ is the latitude, and R is the radius of the globe to be projected. Here, y assumes the sign of φ.

== See also ==
- Max Eckert-Greifendorff
- List of map projections
- Eckert IV projection
- Eckert VI projection
