= Hammer projection =

Pseudoazimuthal equal-area map projection

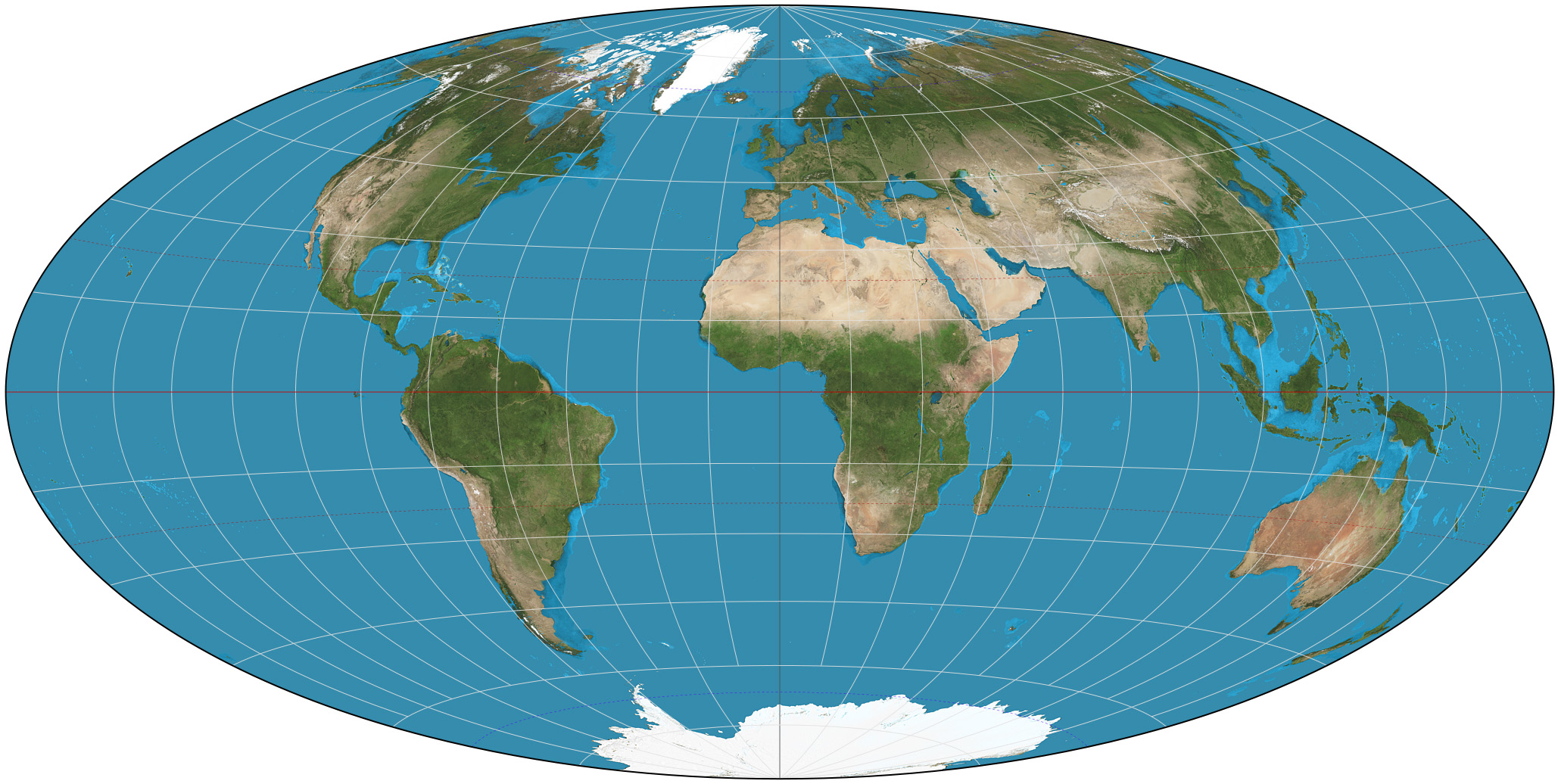
Hammer projection of the world

The Hammer projection with Tissot's indicatrix of deformation

The Hammer projection is an equal-area map projection described by Ernst Hammer in 1892. Using the same 2:1 elliptical outer shape as the Mollweide projection, Hammer intended to reduce distortion in the regions of the outer meridians, where it is extreme in the Mollweide.

== Development ==
Directly inspired by the Aitoff projection, Hammer suggested the use of the equatorial form of the Lambert azimuthal equal-area projection instead of Aitoff's use of the azimuthal equidistant projection:
$$\begin{align} x &= \operatorname{laea}_x\left(\frac{\lambda}{2}, \varphi\right) \\
y &= \tfrac12 \operatorname{laea}_y\left(\frac{\lambda}{2}, \varphi\right) \end{align}$$
where laea_{x} and laea_{y} are the x and y components of the equatorial Lambert azimuthal equal-area projection. Written out explicitly:
$$\begin{align} x &= \frac{2 \sqrt 2 \cos \varphi \sin \frac{\lambda}{2}}{\sqrt{1 + \cos \varphi \cos \frac{\lambda}{2}}} \\
y &= \frac{\sqrt 2\sin \varphi}{\sqrt{1 + \cos \varphi \cos \frac{\lambda}{2}}} \end{align}$$

The inverse is calculated with the intermediate variable
$$z \equiv \sqrt{1 - \left(\tfrac14 x\right)^2 - \left(\tfrac12 y\right)^2}$$

The longitude and latitudes can then be calculated by
$$\begin{align}
\lambda &= 2 \arctan \frac{zx}{2\left(2z^2 - 1\right)} \\
\varphi &= \arcsin zy
\end{align}$$
where λ is the longitude from the central meridian and φ is the latitude.

Visually, the Aitoff and Hammer projections are very similar. The Hammer has seen more use because of its equal-area property. The Mollweide projection is another equal-area projection of similar aspect, though with straight parallels of latitude, unlike the Hammer's curved parallels.

=== Briesemeister ===
William A. Briesemeister presented a variant of the Hammer in 1953. In this version, the central meridian is set to 10°E, the coordinate system is rotated to bring the 45°N parallel to the center, and the resulting map is squashed horizontally and reciprocally stretched vertically to achieve a 7:4 aspect ratio instead of the 2:1 of the Hammer. The purpose is to present the land masses more centrally and with lower distortion.

=== Nordic ===
Before projecting to Hammer, John Bartholomew rotated the coordinate system to bring the 45° north parallel to the center, leaving the prime meridian as the central meridian. He called this variant the "Nordic" projection.

== See also ==
- List of map projections
- Eckert-Greifendorff projection
