= Eckert VI projection =

Pseudocylindrical equal-area map projection

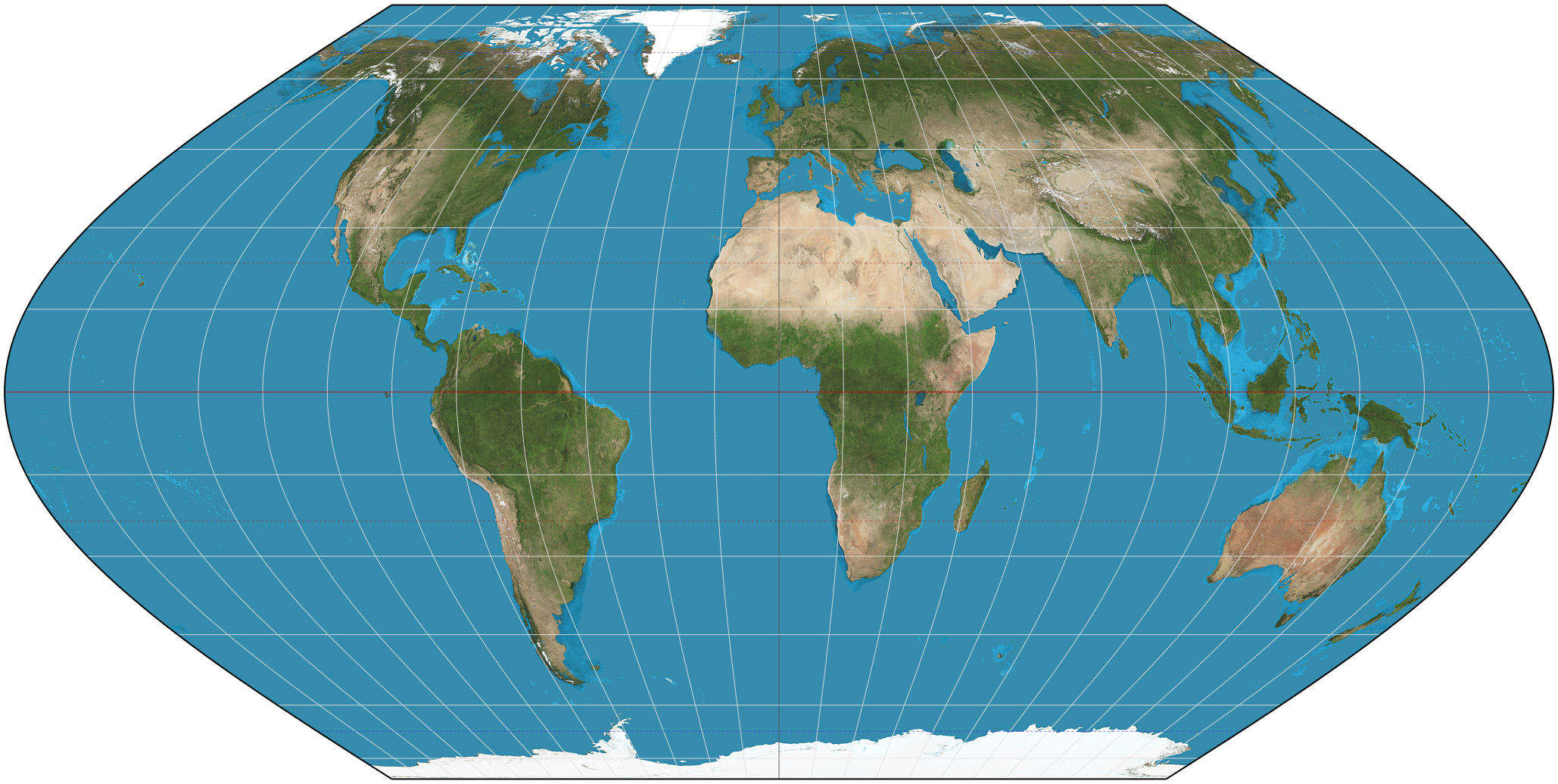
Eckert VI projection of the world

The Eckert VI projection is an equal-area pseudocylindrical map projection. The length of polar line is half that of the equator, and lines of longitude are sinusoids. It was first described by Max Eckert in 1906 as one of a series of three pairs of pseudocylindrical projections. In each pair, the meridians have the same shape, and the odd-numbered projection has equally spaced parallels, whereas the even-numbered projection has parallels spaced to preserve area. The pair to Eckert VI is the Eckert V projection.

== See also ==
- List of map projections
- Eckert II projection
- Eckert IV projection
