= Eckert IV projection =

Pseudocylindrical equal-area map projection

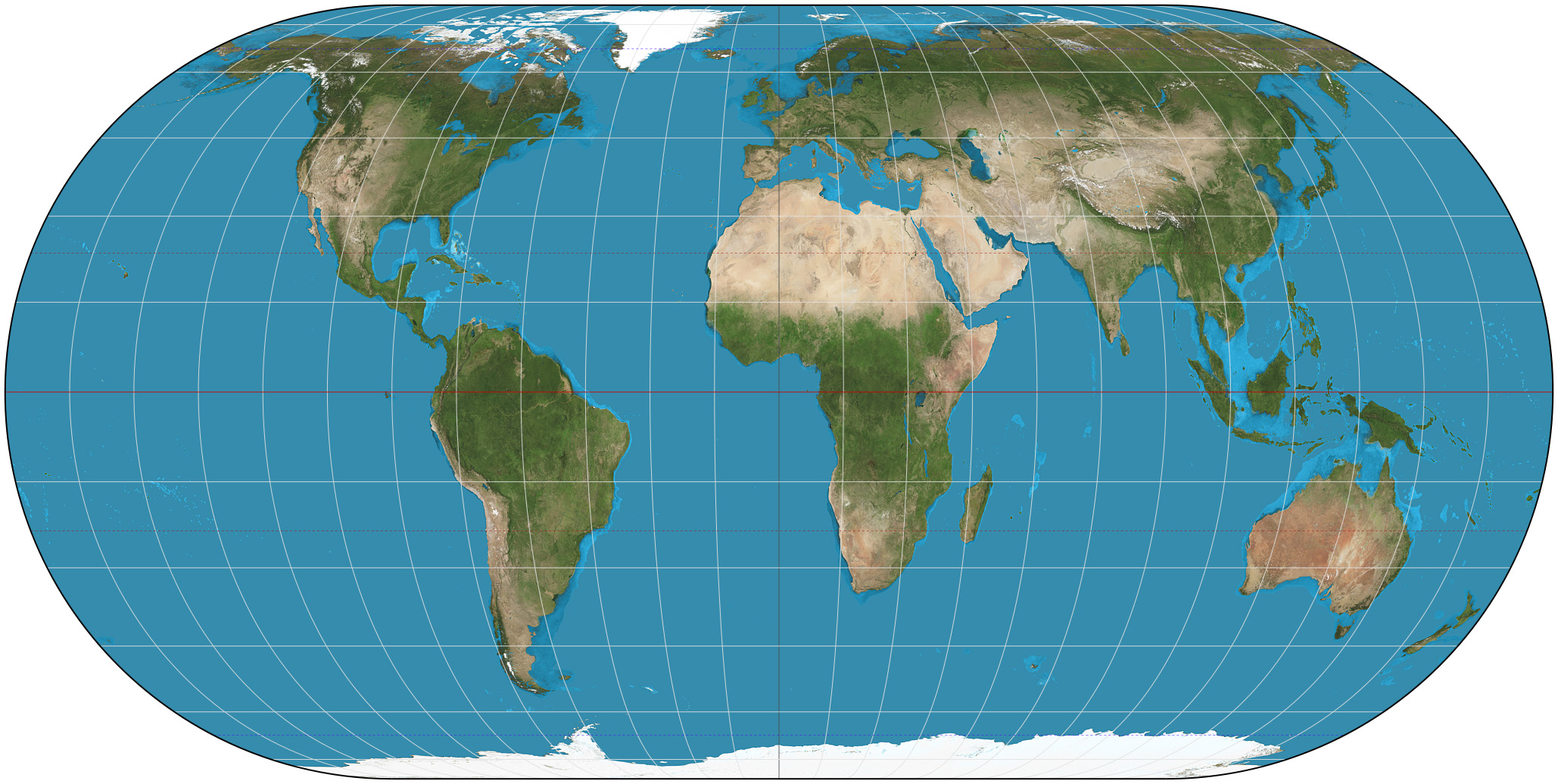
Eckert IV projection of the world.

Eckert IV projection with Tissot's indicatrices of distortion.

The Eckert IV projection is an equal-area pseudocylindrical map projection. The length of the polar lines is half that of the equator, and lines of longitude are semiellipses, or portions of ellipses. It was first described by Max Eckert in 1906 as one of a series of three pairs of pseudocylindrical projections. Within each pair, meridians are the same, whereas parallels differ. Odd-numbered projections have parallels spaced equally, whereas even-numbered projections have parallels spaced to preserve area. Eckert IV is paired with Eckert III.

In September 2026, the French government adopted the Eckert IV projection, to express support for the African Union's UN proposal to implement an equal-area world map and phase out the Mercator projection.

== Formulas ==
=== Forward formulae ===
Given a sphere of radius R, central meridian λ_{0} and a point with geographical latitude φ and longitude λ, plane coordinates x and y can be computed using the following formulas:
$$\begin{align}
x & = \frac{2}{\sqrt{4\pi + \pi^2}} R\, (\lambda - \lambda_0)(1 + \cos \theta) \approx 0.422\,2382\, R\, (\lambda - \lambda_0)(1 + \cos \theta), \\[8pt]
y & = 2 \sqrt{\frac{\pi}{4 + \pi}} R \sin \theta \approx 1.326\,5004\, R \sin \theta,
\end{align}$$
where
$$\theta + \sin \theta \cos \theta + 2 \sin \theta = \left(2 + \frac \pi 2\right) \sin \varphi.$$

θ can be solved for numerically using Newton's method.

=== Inverse formulae ===
$$\begin{align}
\theta & = \arcsin \left[y \frac{\sqrt{4 + \pi}}{2 \sqrt\pi R}\right] \approx \arcsin \left[\frac{y}{1.326\,5004\, R}\right] \\[8pt]
\varphi & = \arcsin \left[\frac{\theta + \sin \theta \cos \theta + 2 \sin \theta}{2 + \frac \pi 2}\right] \\[8pt]
\lambda & = \lambda_0 + x \frac{\sqrt{4\pi + \pi^2}}{2R (1 + \cos \theta)} \approx \lambda_0 + \frac{x}{0.422\,2382\, R\, (1 + \cos \theta)}
\end{align}$$

== See also ==
- List of map projections
- Eckert II projection
- Eckert VI projection
- Max Eckert-Greifendorff
