= Leonardo's world map =

Map possibly by Leonardo da Vinci c. 1514

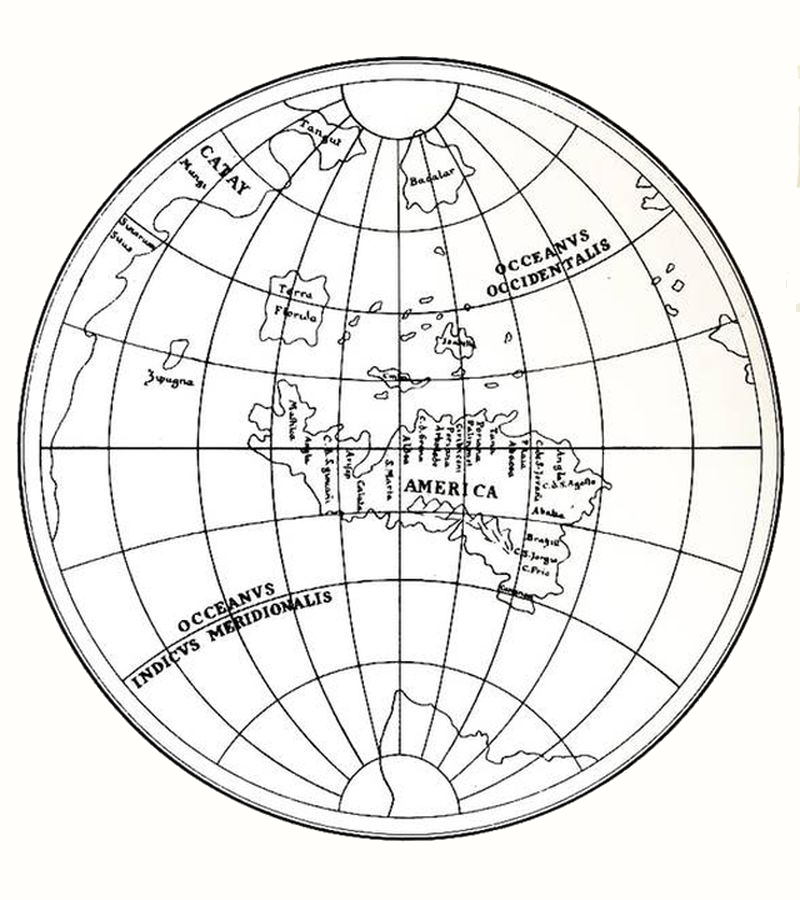
Modern recreation of Leonardo da Vinci's world map

Leonardo's world map is the name assigned to a unique world map drawn using the "octant projection" and found loosely inserted among a Codex of Leonardo da Vinci preserved in Windsor. It features an early use of the toponym America and incorporates information from the travels of Amerigo Vespucci, published in 1503 and 1505. Additionally, the map depicts the Arctic as an ocean and Antarctica as a continent of about the correct size.

The conjecture that the map was drawn by Leonardo himself is not universally accepted by scholars. Richard Henry Major, who first published the map in 1865 and defended its authenticity, dated it around 1514 because Florida is drawn as an island with the name of TERRA FLORIDA.

== Description ==
Leonardo da Vinci developed the concept of dividing the surface of the globe into eight spherical equilateral triangles based on his botanical drawings. Each section of the globe is bounded by the Equator and two meridians separate by 90°. This was the first map of this type. Some critics believe that the existing map was not really an autograph work, since the precision and expertise in the drawing does not reflect the usual high standards of Leonardo. They suggest that it was probably done by a trusted employee or copyist at Leonardo's workshop. Leonardo's authorship would be demonstrated by Christopher Tyler in his paper entitled "Leonardo da Vinci’s World Map", in which he provides examples of derivative maps in a similar projection to Leonardo's. The map was originally documented by R. H. Major in his work Memoir on a mappemonde by Leonardo da Vinci, the earliest map Being Known hitherto container containing the name of America

The eight triangles are configured as two four-leaf clovers side by side, with the earth poles in the center of each clove. One of the sides of the eight triangles (the one opposite the center of the pseudo clover), forms one fourth of the equator, the remaining two (those that converge to the center of the pseudo clover) forming the two meridians that, combined with the equator, dissect the globe into eight octants.

The name of "Florida" (Terra Florida), correctly placed opposite Cuba although in the form of "an island", is used after the discovery of Florida in 1513 and the return of Ponce de Leon's expedition.

== Authorship ==
Leonardo's authorship of the map is not universally accepted, with some authors being completely against any minimal contribution from him, either in the map or in the type of projection used; among them, Henry Harrisse (1892), or Eugène Müntz (1899 - citing Harrisse authority from 1892).

Since the discovery of the Ostrich Egg Globe, Stefaan Missinne has written a book in which he argues that the authorship of the design of the map is Leonardo's. In contrast the cartographic content is by a third hand. The manuscript world map intended to be glued has been attributed to Melzi, because of the type of lettering used and because of his proximity to Leonardo during his stay in France. Missinne finds it difficult to substantiate this attribution. He argues that on the map, the capital letters and small letters are used in combination, which is contradictory to Leonardo's customary practice. In addition, an unhatched mountain range in South America, is depicted showing only one not particularly “attractive” river. Missinne argues that the precise level of detail, for which Leonardo was known, is lacking. In contrast, the maker drew many toponyms on the coastal ranges, which shows that he must have used a portolan map as a template. The oceans do bear names and the spelling has only a few “mistakes,” i.e. variants such as “Brazill” ending with a double “l.” The letter “z” on C (abo) B (ona) speranza differs considerably from Leonardo’s types of “z.” which is also the case for the “b” in “Abatia”. Missinne's findings, however, are disputed.

Several scholars explicitly accept the authorship of both map and projection completely as Leonardo's work, describing the octant projection as the first of this type, among them, R. H. Major (1865) in his work Memoir on a mappemonde by Leonardo da Vinci, being the earliest map hitherto known containing the name of America, the "Enciclopedia universal ilustrada europeo-americana" (1934), Snyder in his book Flattening the Earth (1993), Christopher Tyler in his paper (2014) Leonardo da Vinci’s World Map, José Luis Espejo in his book (2012) Los mensajes ocultos de Leonardo Da Vinci, or David Bower in his work (2012) The unusual projection for one of John Dee's maps of 1580.

Others also accept explicitly the authorship of both the map and its projection as authentic, although leaving open the question of Leonardo's direct hand, giving the authorship of the work to one of his disciples as Nordenskiöld states in his book Facsimile-Atlas (1889) confirmed by Dutton (1995) and many others: "..on account of the remarkable projection not by Leonardo himself, but by some ignorant clerk.", or Keunig (1955) being more precise: "..by one of his followers at his direction.."

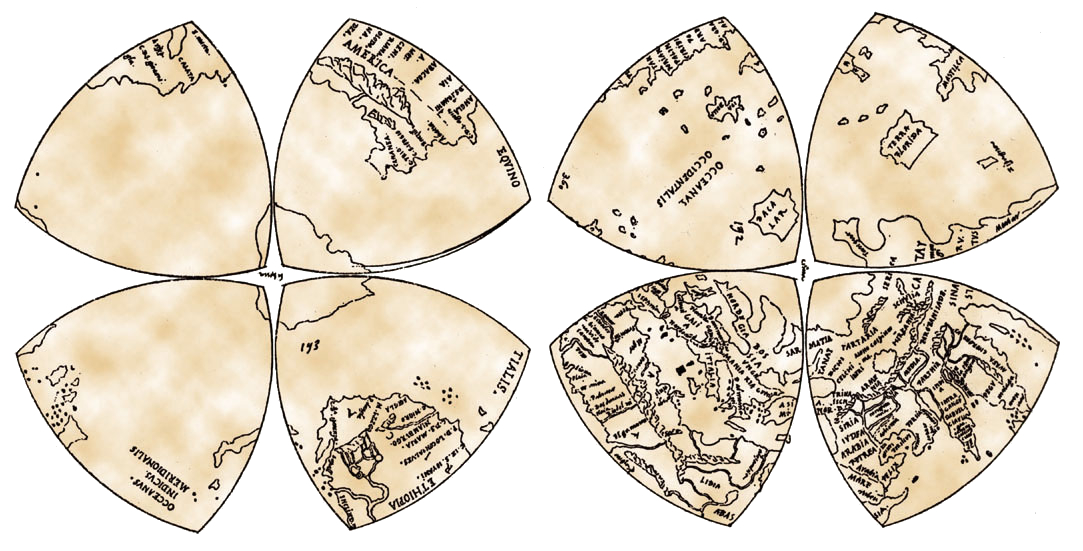
Leonardo da Vinci's world map in eight Reuleaux triangle octants

== Mathematical reconstruction ==
The subject of mathematical analysis of Leonardo's octant globe has been considered very briefly in scientific publications. There are also few images of reconstruction of this globe.

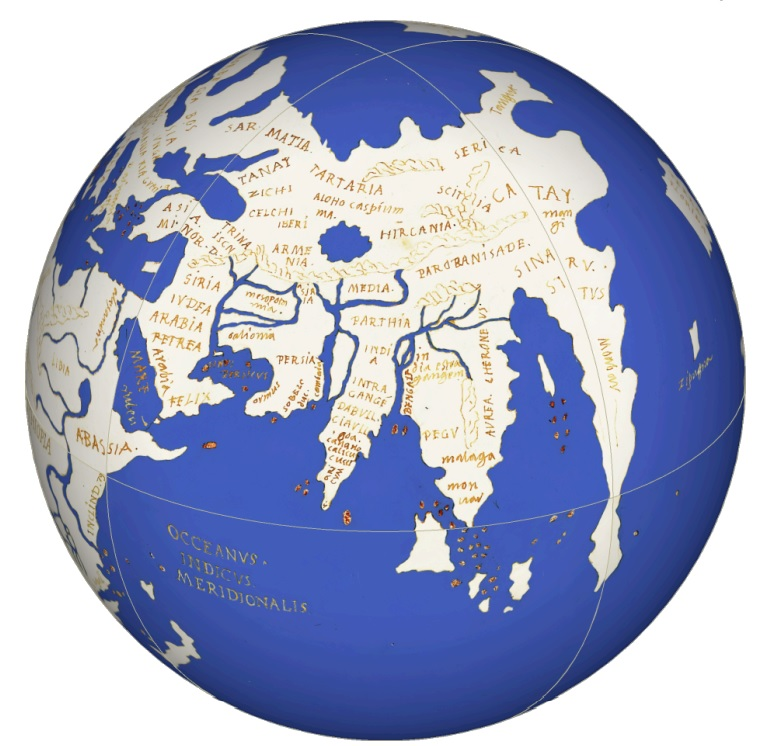
Leonardo da Vinci octant globe reconstruction

== See also ==
- List of works by Leonardo da Vinci
- Bernard J. S. Cahill
- Codex Atlanticus
- Cahill–Keyes projection
- Waterman butterfly projection
- Waterman polyhedron
