= Octant projection =

Polyhedral compromise map projection

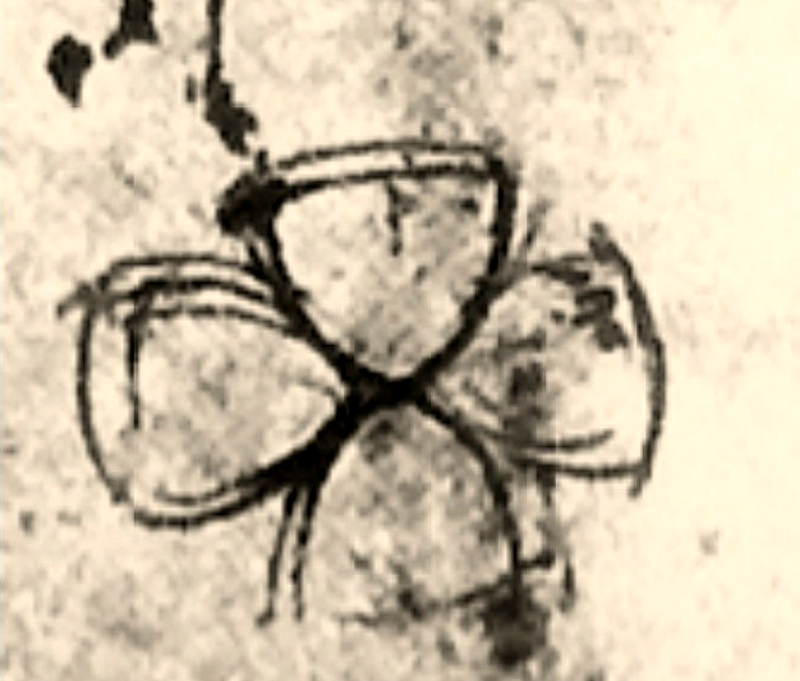
Outline of the octant projection in Codex Atlanticus

The octant projection or octants projection, is a type of map projection proposed the first time, in 1508, by Leonardo da Vinci in his Codex Atlanticus. Leonardo's authorship would be demonstrated by Christopher Tyler, who stated "For those projections dated later than 1508, his drawings should be effectively considered the original precursors."

The same page of the Codex contains sketches of eight other projections of the globe (those known in the late fifteenth century) studied by Leonardo, including Ptolemy's conical planisphere projection and Roselli's pseudocylindric projection.

== Description ==
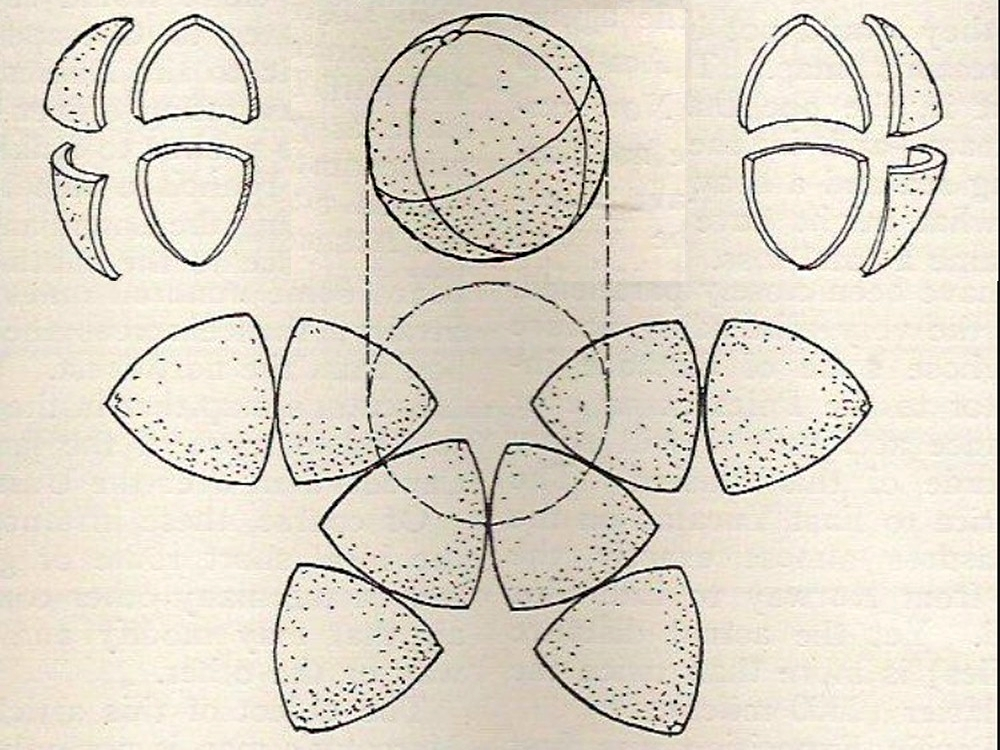
Development of Cahill-butterfly's quasi-octant projection circa 1915

The octant projection is the first known polyhedral map projection. It is neither conformal nor equal-area. In it, the spherical surface of the earth is divided into eight octants, each flattened into the shape of a Reuleaux triangle bound by circular arcs. If transferred to an elastic support, it would be possible to cover with them the surface of a model of the earth's globe.

The eight triangles are oriented in a similar way as per two four-leaf clovers side by side (fleurons), being the earth poles in the center of each clove. One of the sides of the eight triangles, (the one opposite to the center of the pseudo clover), is one fourth of the equator, the remaining two (those that converge to the center of the pseudo clover), are part of the two meridians that with the equator dissect the globe in the eight octants.

== Similar projections ==
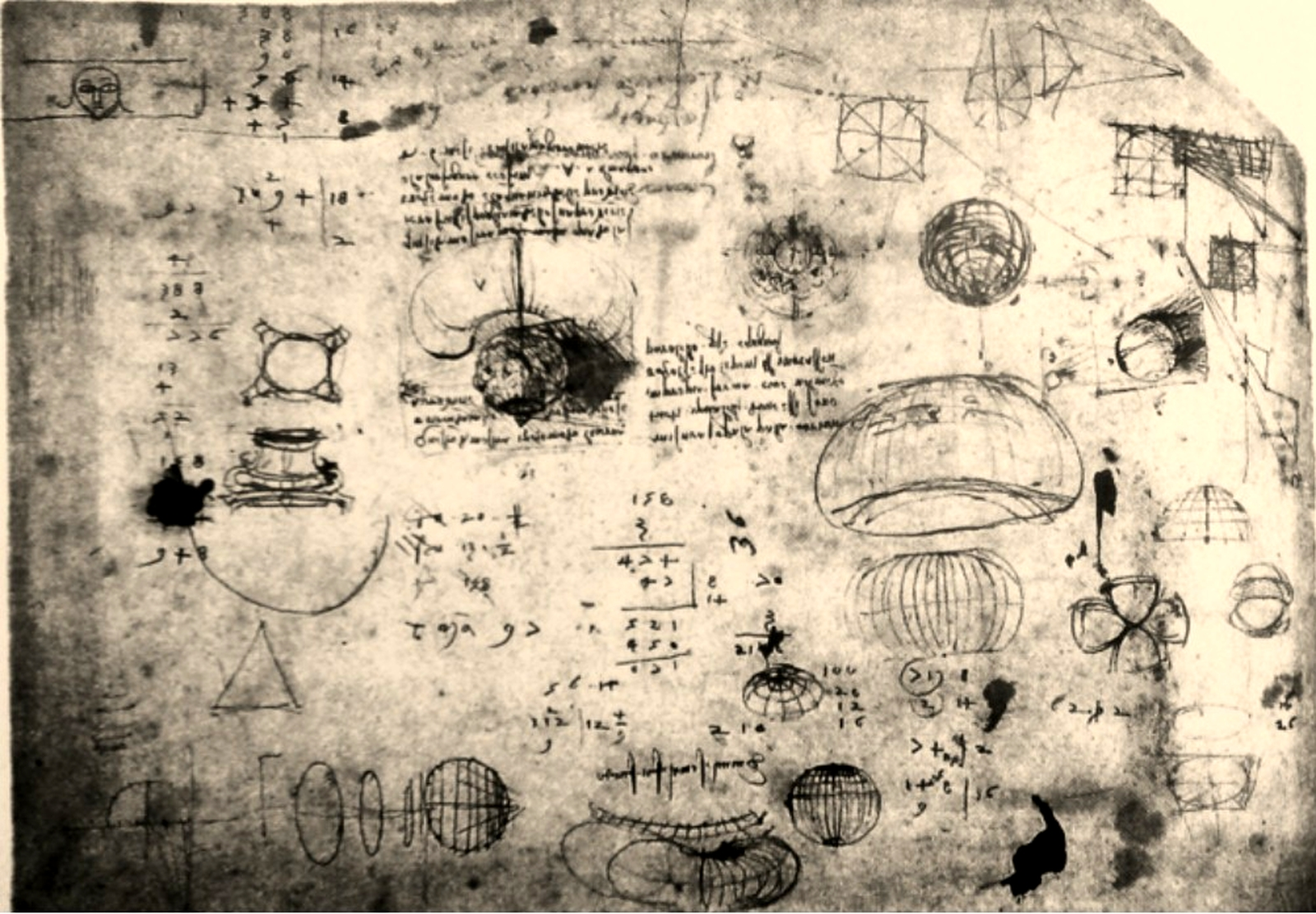
Outline in Codex Atlanticus with sketches of eight other projections of the globe being studied by Leonardo

Projections also based on the Reuleaux triangle were published by:

- 1549 – Oronce Finé
- 1556 – Le Testu
- 1580 – John Dee
- 1616 – Nicolaas Geelkercken
- 1894 – Fiorini
- 1909 – Bernard J. S. Cahill
- 1916 – Anthiaume
- 1938 – Uhden
- 1955 – Keuning
- 1975 – Cahill–Keyes

== History of authorship research ==
Although Leonardo's first description of the octant projection has been proved by Tyler, who decided to treat separately Leonardo's projection authorship (1508) from Leonardo's map authorship (1514), the other authors before him treat together the authorship of both map and projection, for they speak about "the eighth of a supposed globe represented in a plane" or about "globe sections" (Harrisse) or others about "gores", which are in fact a projection of the globe.

So, bearing in mind the fact that Tyler was the first scholar to mention the sketch of this projection in Codex Atlanticus in 2017, the authorship of the map it is not universally accepted, with some authors being completely against any minimal contribution from Leonardo, such as Henry Harrisse (1892), or Eugène Müntz (1899 – citing Harrisse authority from 1892, although none of them talks about the projection's sketch in Codex Atlanticus).

Other scholars accept explicitly both (map and projection: "the eight of a supposed globe represented in a plane"), completely as a Leonardo's work, describing the projection as the first of this type, among them, R. H. Major (1865) in his work Memoir on a mappemonde by Leonardo da Vinci, being the earliest map hitherto known containing the name of America, Grothe, the Enciclopedia universal ilustrada europeo-americana (1934), Snyder in his book Flattening the Earth (1993), Christopher Tyler in his paper (2014) "Leonardo da Vinci's World Map", José Luis Espejo in his book (2012) Los mensajes ocultos de Leonardo Da Vinci, or David Bower in his work (2012) "The unusual projection for one of John Dee's maps of 1580".

Others also accept explicitly both (map and projection) as authentic, although leaving in the air Leonardo's direct hand, giving the authorship of the work to one of his disciples as Nordenskjold states in his book Facsimile-Atlas (1889) confirmed by Dutton (1995) and many others: "on account of the remarkable projection..not by Leonardo himself, but by some ignorant clerk", or Keunig (1955) being more precise: "by one of his followers at his direction".

== Octant projection layouts ==
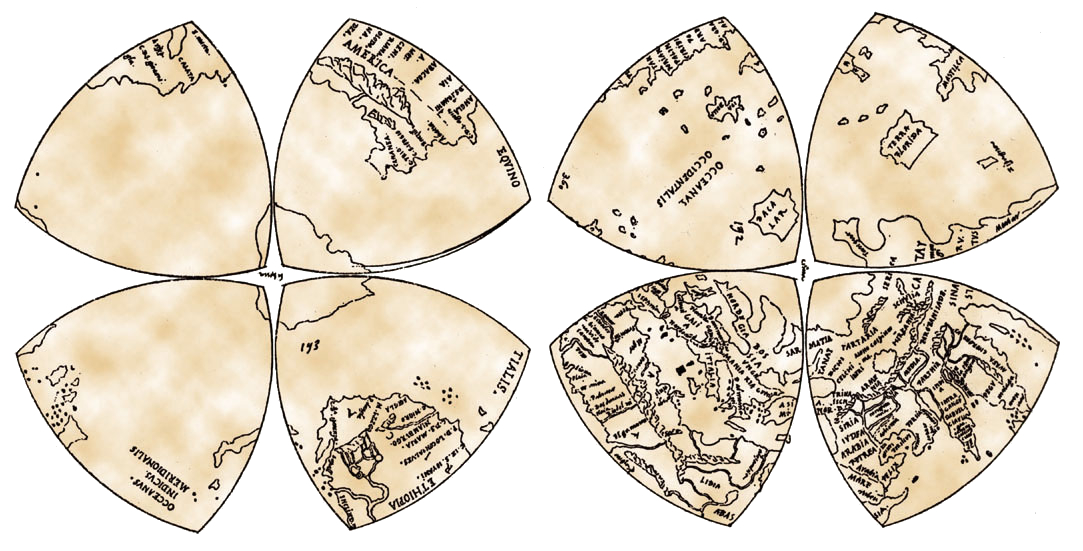
Leonardo da Vinci's octant projection in eight octants with Reuleaux triangle's shape

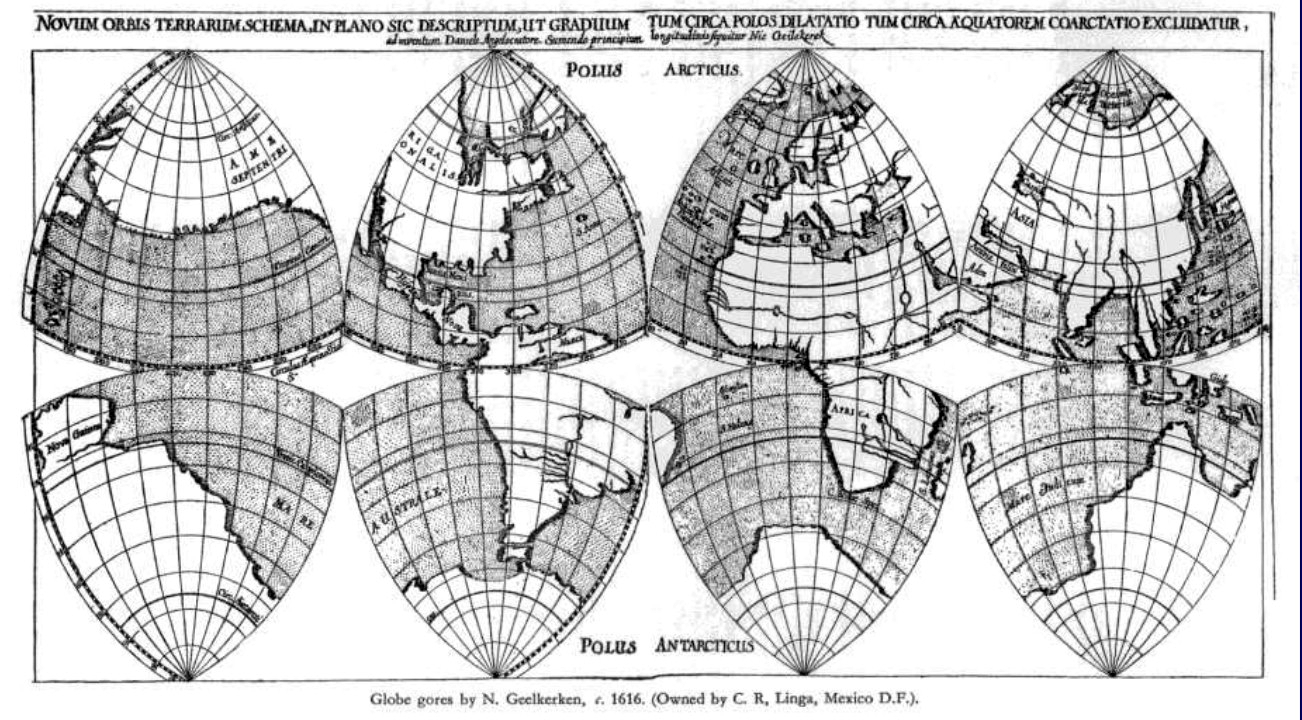
Nicolaas-Geelkercken's 1616 octant projection in eight octants with Reuleaux triangle's shape

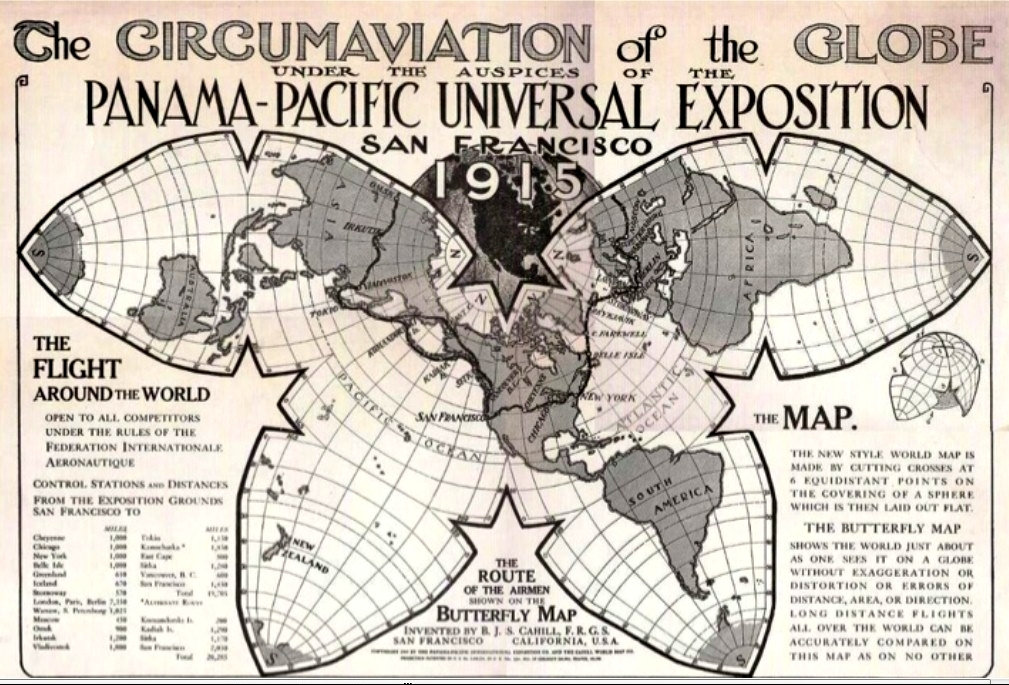
Cahill-butterfly's quasi-octant projection from 1915 circum-aviation of the globe

== See also ==
- World map
- List of map projections
- List of works by Leonardo da Vinci
- Leonardo's world map
- Rhumbline network
- Waterman butterfly projection
- Waterman polyhedron
- Bernard J. S. Cahill
