= Madrid Codex =

Madrid Codex might refer to:

- Madrid Codex (Maya), also known as the Tro-Cortesianus Codex, one of three surviving pre-Columbian Maya books.
- Codex Madrid (Leonardo), two codices by Leonardo da Vinci.
