= José Luis Espejo Pérez =

Spanish writer and historian

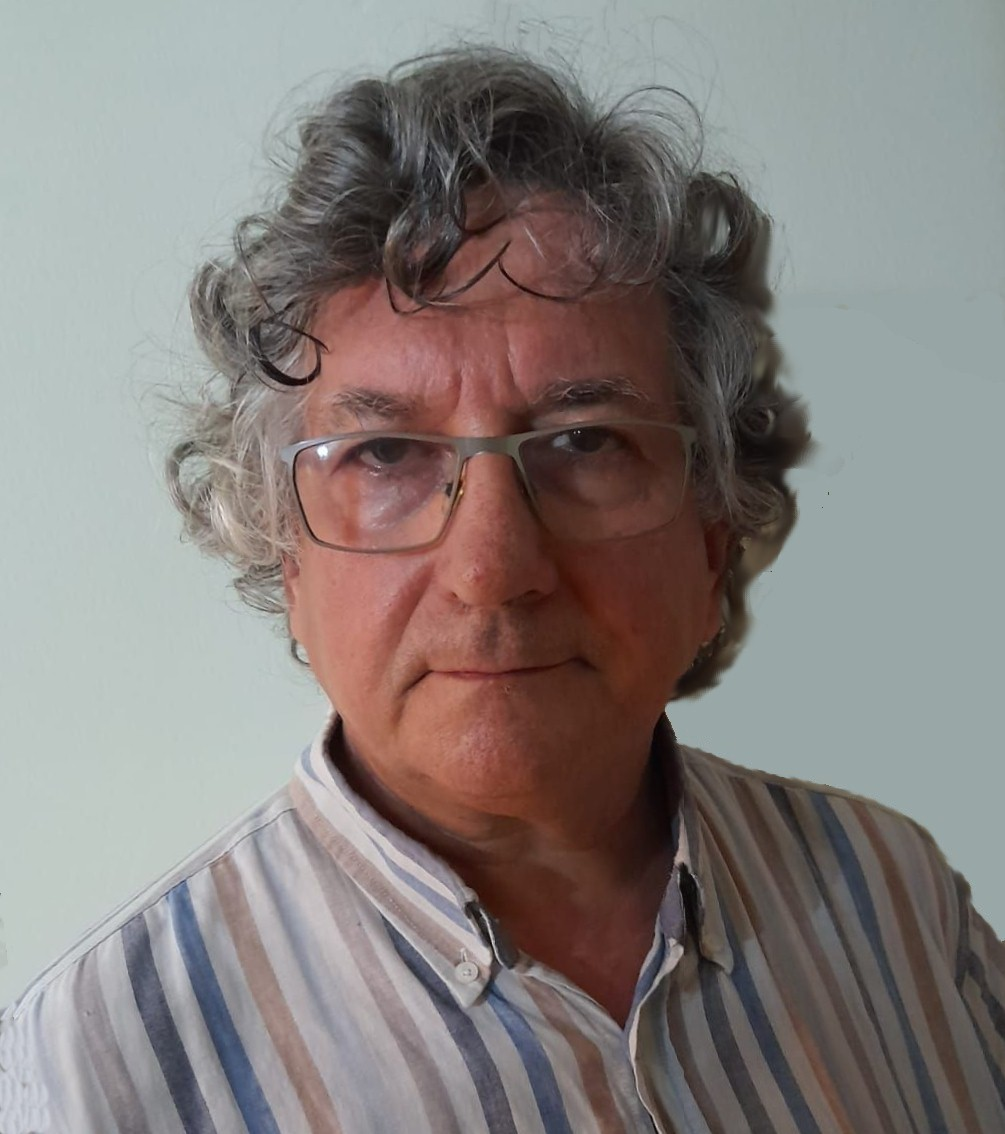

José Luis Espejo Pérez (born in Barcelona in 1965), is a Spanish-language writer specializing in historical essays.

== Biography ==
Born in Barcelona in 1965, Pérez studied at the University of Barcelona, obtaining a degree in Geography and History. Between 1985 and 1992 he was editor of the critical magazine L'esborrany, published in Sant Boi de Llobregat. At the same time he worked as an editor in several technical press magazines. Between the years 1992 and 1998 he collaborated in the preparation of three monographs of a social nature in the magazine Arguments and Proposals, published by L'Eina Editorial. Between 1998 and 2002 he lived in the city of Bath (United Kingdom), a period in which he worked as a screenwriter in several audiovisual companies. Previously (in 1994) he spent eight months in the United States. His knowledge of the cultural reality in these two Anglo-Saxon countries brought him into contact with the two subjects he deals with most in his books: Social Reality and Critical History. He returned to Spain in 2002, to dedicate himself to writing historical essay books, among them, El Conocimiento secreto: Los entresijos de las sociedades secretas and Los hijos del Edén: toda la verdad sobre la Atlántida. He made trips to Italy and France (until 2007 and 2008), compiling for 10 years a large amount of documentation on the life and work of Leonardo da Vinci . As a result of this research, he published the book: Leonardo: los años perdidos, and later El viaje secreto de Leonardo da Vinci and Los mensajes ocultos de Leonardo da Vinci .

Helena R. Olmo quotes him in her article on the tomb of Gioconda. The television presenter and writer Christian Gálvez quotes him in his novel about Leonardo. Jesús Ángel Sánchez Rivera alludes to his "picturesque" theses in a work entitled "Seguir la corriente o navegar sobre las olas", published in the magazine Clio: History and History Teaching. He was a contributor to the magazine "Más allá de la Ciencia", in which he specializes in articles with historical content. He is also the author of the two books in the series "Temas de Historia Occulta".

Since 2004, he has collaborated in various works of an audiovisual nature and historical memory with the Municipal Historical Archive of Sant Boi de Llobregat (Museum in the neighbourhoods project), among others in 2011 he published La Atlántida: lo que la ciencia oculta which has exceeded 2,000,000 views.

== Studies and works ==
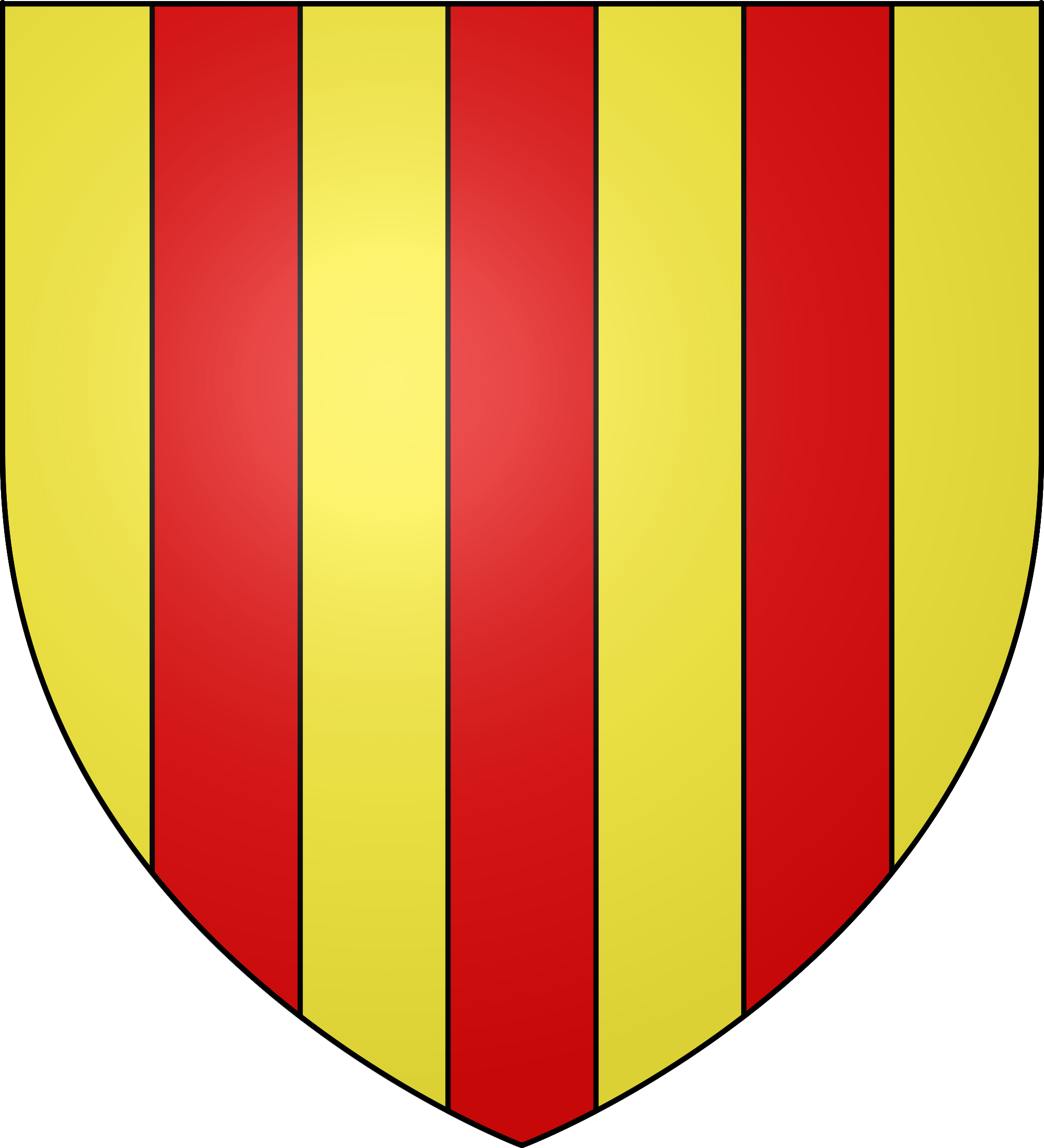
Da Vinci coat of arms according to Espejo.

Espejo maintains that Leonardo da Vinci's family were Cathars from Conflent (Oriental Pyrenees), who in 1213 (Battle of Muret) would have emigrated to Tuscany, fleeing the repression of the Church against the Cathar heresy, as would be shown by different facts: that its coat of arms is the same as that of the Crown of Aragon and more specifically that of the Kingdom of Mallorca, that an ancestor of the Da Vinci family (Giovanni Da Vinci) died in Barcelona in 1406, that among his affairs there was "a Catalan cape (or coat)" (a "catalano rosato"), that in the Codex Atlanticus he draws in great detail a Catalan forge or the "circumfulgore " (barge with twelve bombard guns facing each other) saying that "it was built by the people of Maiolica" and that in his paintings, you can appreciate several details more related to Catalonia than to the interior of the Italian peninsula, such as the Ramonda myconi of the Virgin of the rocks of London (typical herb of the Pyrenees) and the margallon of the Virgin of the rocks of the Louvre (typical plant of the Catalan coast), but both being non-existent in Milan and inland Tuscany, which in Leonardo's time had not yet annexed the Duchy of Pisa and only possessed the narrow corridor along the Arno's riverside, which was their access to the port of Livorno (bought from Genoa in 1421).

Espejo explains in his books that Leonardo would have traveled to Catalonia on at least two occasions, residing there between 1481 and 1483 where he would have painted, in Montserrat, "Sant Jeroni", apart from taking notes and drawings that he would have used in La Verge de les Roques and La Gioconda, whose smile would reflect the "expression of the Moreneta's mouth" with the mountains of Montserrat in the background landscapes, while the landscape of the "Annunciation" of the Uffizi Galleries, would correspond to a view of the port of Barcelona .

Espejo was the first author to describe (in Spanish) Leonardo's relationship with the authorship of the octant-type projection of the globe (projection used in the world map discovered by Richard Henry Major in the Leonardo papers of the Windsor Library). This authorship would be demonstrated by the study of Christoher Tyler, since there is a sketch of it on a page in the notebooks of the Codex Atlanticus made by Leonardo's own hand (in mirror symmetry) on the same page of the Codex which contains the sketches of another eight projections of the globe (those known at the end of the fifteenth century), studied by Leonardo and which range from the conical projection of Ptolemy to the planisphere-type one of Rosselli, (being this the first known description of this projection).

== Books ==
- 1.Alto riesgo: los costes del progreso, José Luis Espejo Pérez, Barcelona: Fapa, DL 2004.
- 2.Leonardo: los años perdidos, José Luis Espejo Pérez, Barcelona: El Andén, 2008.
- 3. El Conocimiento secreto: Los entresijos de las sociedades secretas, José Luis Espejo Pérez, Barcelona : Ediciones B, 2009.
- 4.Los hijos del Edén: toda la verdad sobre la Atlántida, José Luis Espejo Pérez, Barcelona: Ediciones B, 2010.
- 5. El viaje secreto de Leonardo da Vinci, José Luis Espejo Pérez, Barcelona: Editorial Base, 2010.
- 6.Los mensajes ocultos de Leonardo da Vinci, José Luis Espejo Pérez, Barcelona – Base, 2012.
- 7.Temas de historia oculta: nuestro pasado robado, José Luis Espejo Pérez Barcelona : Base, 2015.
- 8. El sueño de Hitler, una pesadilla para la humanidad, José Luis Espejo Pérez Barcelona : Base, 2015.
- 9.Temas de historia oculta II: Las doctrinas prohibidas, José Luis Espejo Pérez Barcelona : Base, 2016.
- 10.Ecos de la Atlántida, José Luis Espejo Pérez Barcelona : Base, 2018.
- 11. Memorias de Leonardo da Vinci, José Luis Espejo Pérez Barcelona : Base, 2019.
- 12. El árbol de los mitos, José Luis Espejo Pérez Barcelona : Base, 2022.

== See also ==
- Octant projection
- Leonardo's world map
- Oronce Finé
- Henry Harrisse
