= Henry Harrisse =

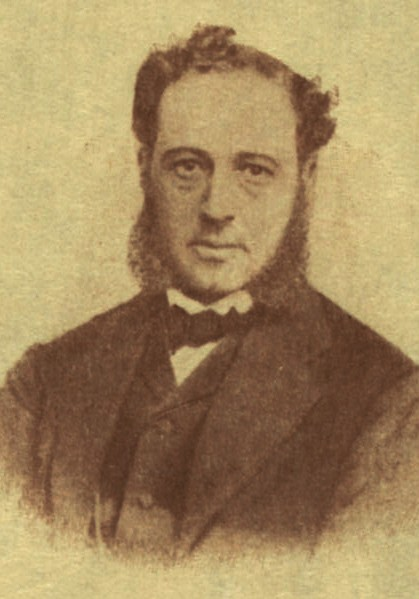
- Born: May 28, 1829; Paris
- Died: May 13, 1910 (aged 80); Paris
- Occupation: Jurist

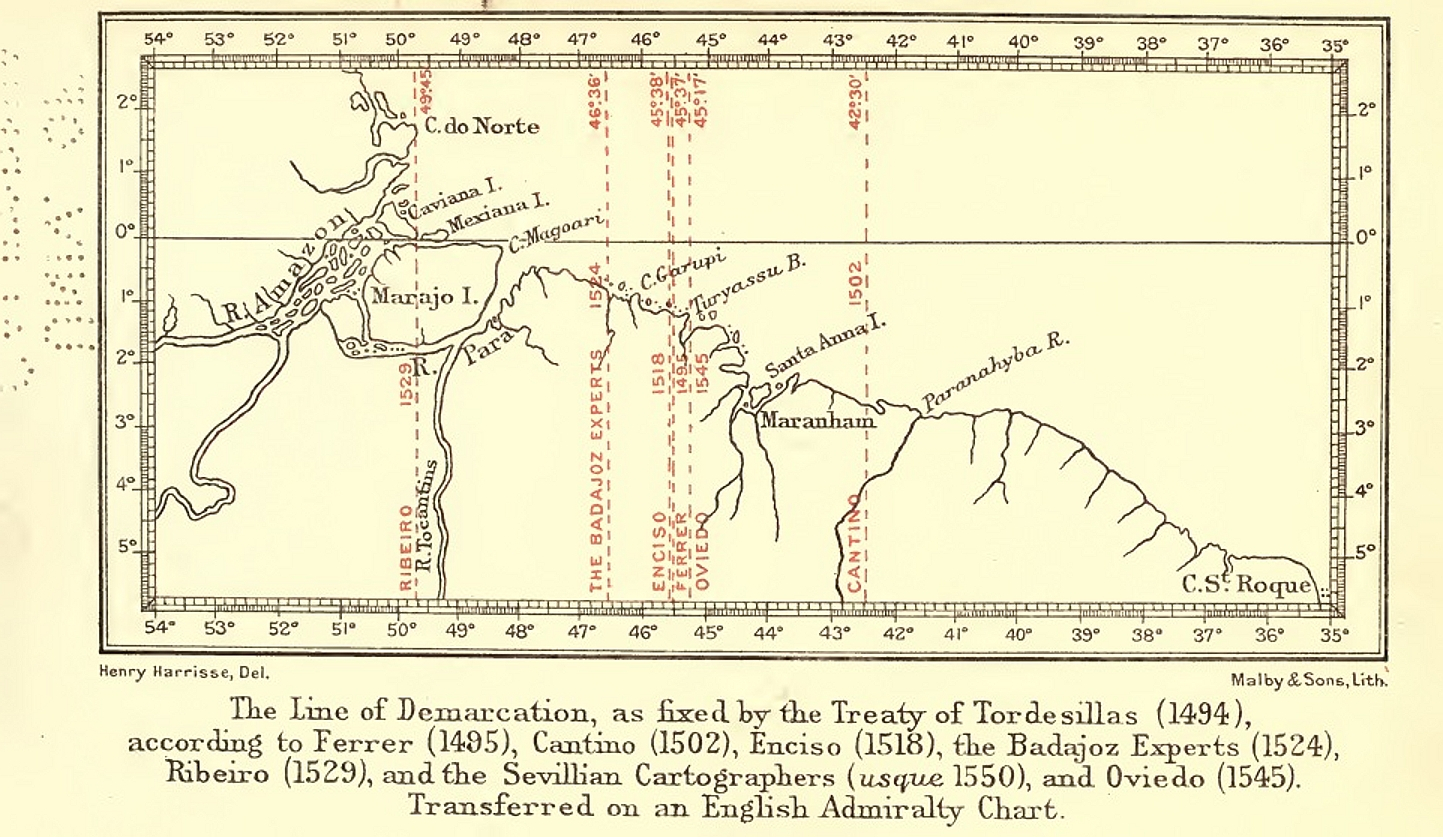
The early Spanish and Portuguese computations of the Tordesillas Meridian, according to Harrisse.

Henry Harrisse (May 28, 1829 – May 13, 1910) was a writer, lawyer, art critic, and American historian who authored books on the discovery of America and geographic representations of the New World.

== Biography ==
Henry Harrisse was born Henry Herrisse in Paris on May 28, 1829. His father was Abraham Herrisse, a furrier, probably from Russia or Prague, and his mother was Nanine Marcus of Paris. At the age of eighteen, he moved to America with his family and adopted American nationality, where he studied at the University of South Carolina. He began his academic career at the University of North Carolina, where he taught writing, philosophy, and law, though he was later released from his position due to his support of abolitionism. In following years, he worked as a lawyer in Chicago and New York, before beginning his writing career. According to his biographer Henri Cordier, his early writings are devoted to Hippolyte Taine and Renan, and the analysis of the metaphysical works of Descartes. Later in his life, he moved back to Paris and turned his studies towards the origins of the modern Americas, a topic to which he was highly devoted. This led to his exploration of records of the discovery of the Americas, and to his amassing of a substantial body of critical and historical works on this subject.

Harrisse was elected a member of the American Antiquarian Society in 1893.

== Bibliography ==
The works of Henry Harrisse published in English, Latin, Spanish, and French:

- Bibliotheca Americana Vetustissima (1866)
- Notes on Columbus (1866)
- D. Fernando Colon (1871)
- Notes sur la Nouvelle France (1872)
- Jean et Sébastien Cabot (1882)
- Les Corte-Reals (1883)
- Christophe Colomb: Son Origine, Sa Vie, Ses Voyages, Sa Famille et Ses Descendants (1884)
- The Discovery of North America (1892)
- The Diplomatic History of America: Its First Chapter 1452–1493–1494, London: B.F. Stevens, 1897.

== See also ==
- Leonardo's world map
- Octant projection
- Waterman butterfly projection
