= Bernard J. S. Cahill =

Inventor of the butterfly projection map

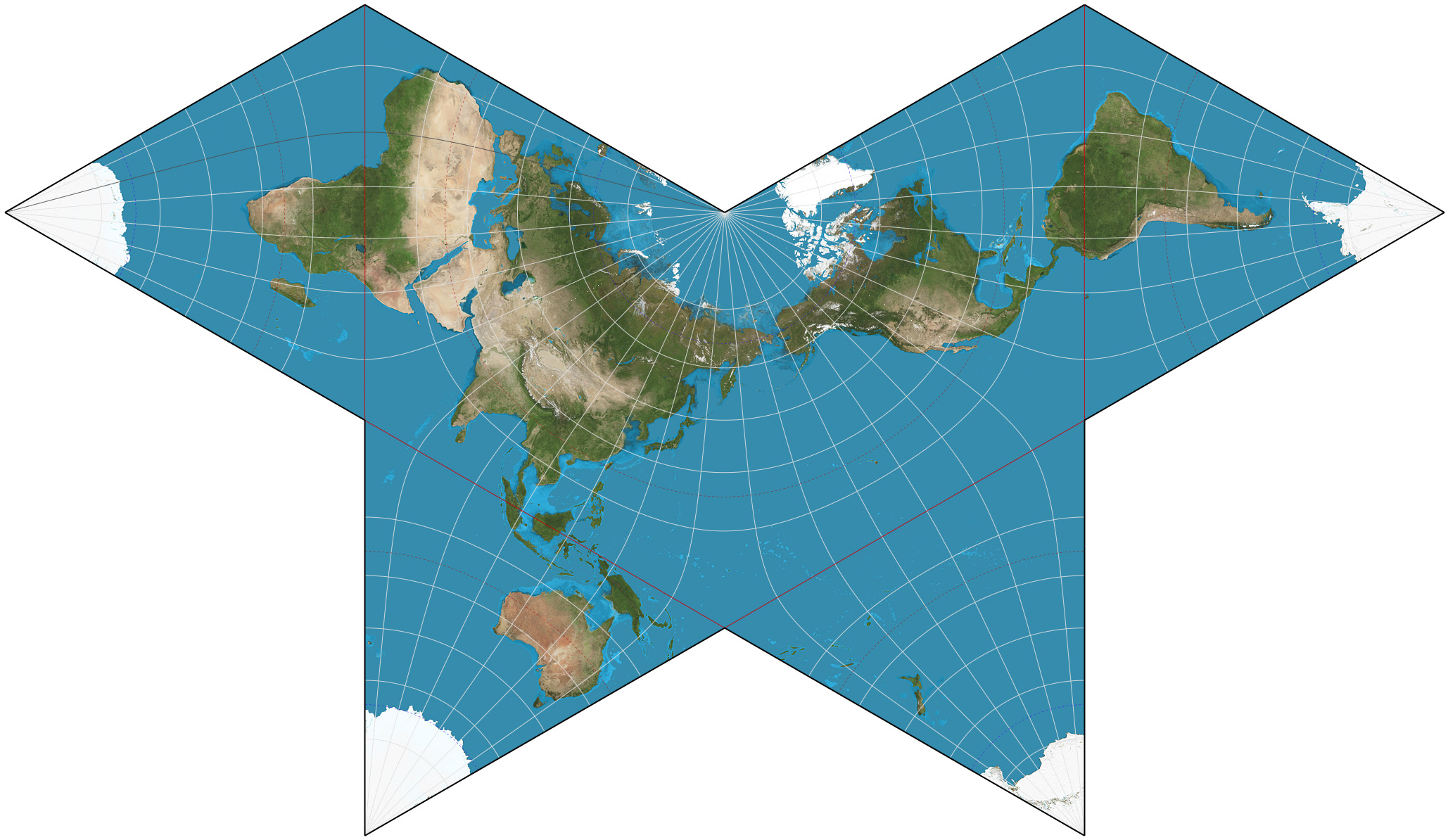
Cahill butterfly, conformal version of the projection. 15° graticule, 157°30′E central meridian.

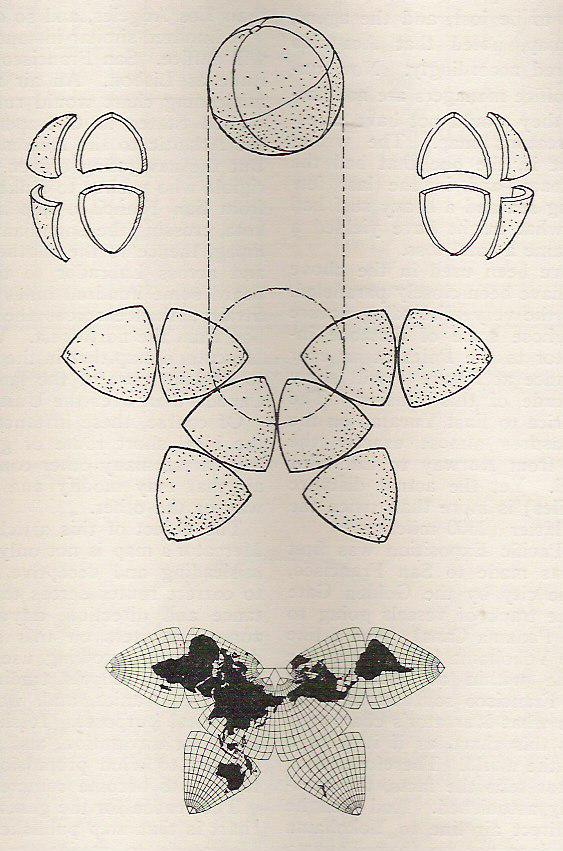
From cover of 1919 pamphlet by Cahill, "The Butterfly Map", 8 p.

Bernard Joseph Stanislaus Cahill (London, January 30, 1866 – Alameda County, October 4, 1944) was an American cartographer and architect who invented the octahedral "Butterfly Map" (published in 1909 and patented in 1913). An early proponent of the San Francisco Civic Center, he also designed hotels, factories and mausoleums like the Columbarium of San Francisco.

His polyhedral Butterfly World Map, like Buckminster Fuller's later Dymaxion map of 1943 and 1954, enabled all continents to be uninterrupted, and with reasonable fidelity to a globe. Cahill demonstrated this principle by also inventing a rubber-ball globe which could be flattened under a pane of glass in the "butterfly" form, then return to its ball shape.

A variant was developed by Gene Keyes in 1975, the Cahill–Keyes projection.

== See also ==
- World map
- Waterman butterfly projection
- Octants projection
- Cahill–Keyes projection

== Selected works ==
- "An Account of a New Land Map of the World" (The Scottish Geographical Magazine, 1909–09) pp. 449–469 [reproduced in 21 jpegs] The first publication and exposition of the Butterfly Map.
- "Map of the World" (U.S. patent 1,054,276, 1913) Washington, DC: United States Patent Office, 1913-02-25; filed 1912-03-05
- "Geographic Globe" (US Patent 1081207, 1913: rubber-ball globe which can flatten to a Butterfly Map, or return to ball shape.)
- "Projections for World Maps" (1929) —continued in separate pdf:— "A New Map for Meteorologists: Equally Suitable for Small Areas, Continents, Hemispheres or the Entire World" – both from Monthly Weather Review, 57/4, 1929–04) pp. 128–133; illus.
- "One Base Map in Place of Five" (1940) Monthly Weather Review, 68/2, 1940–02, p. 4; 1 illus.
