= Waterman butterfly projection =

Polyhedral compromise map projection

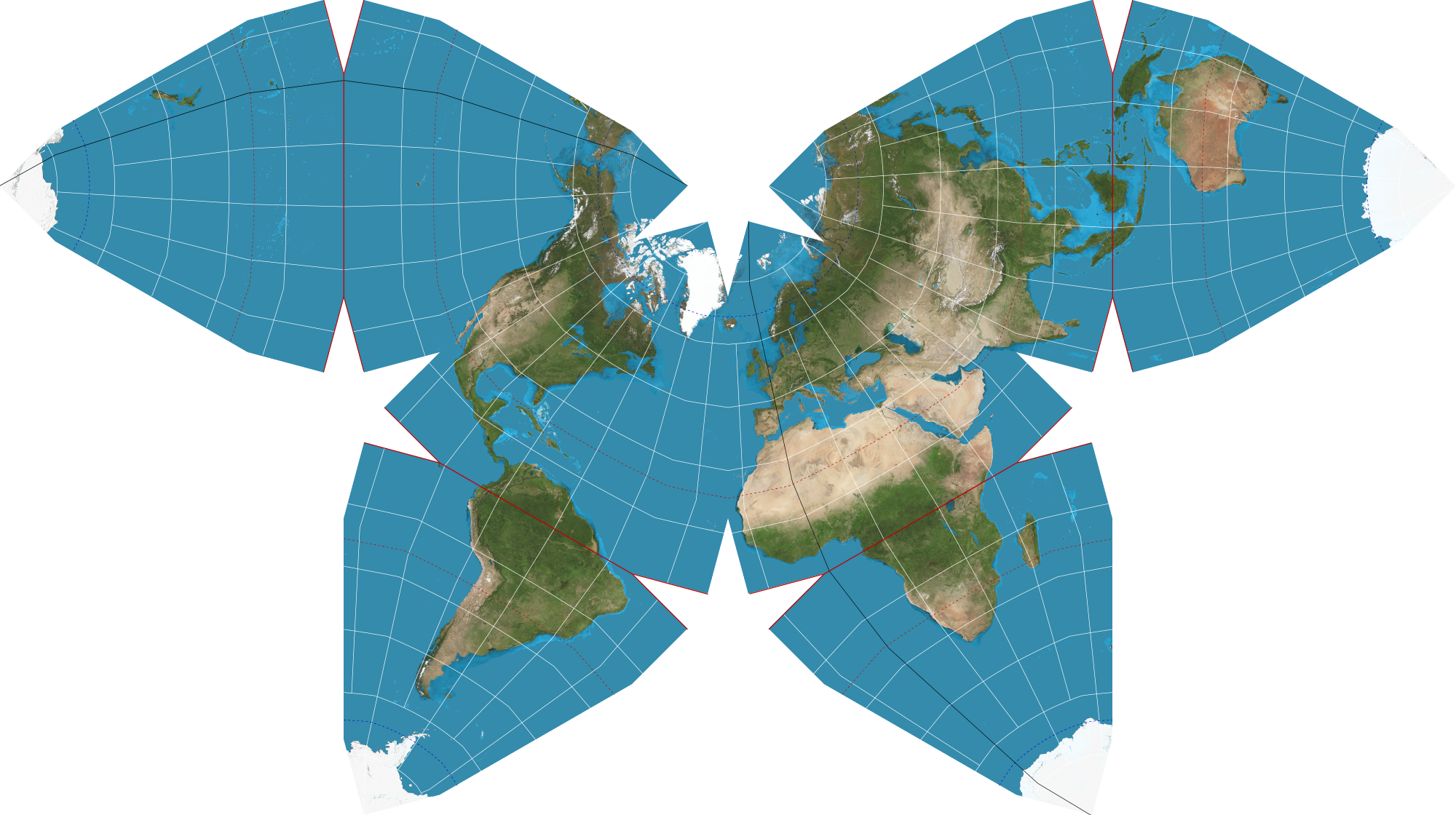
Waterman projection centered on Atlantic, with Antarctica divided

The Waterman projection with Tissot's indicatrix of deformation

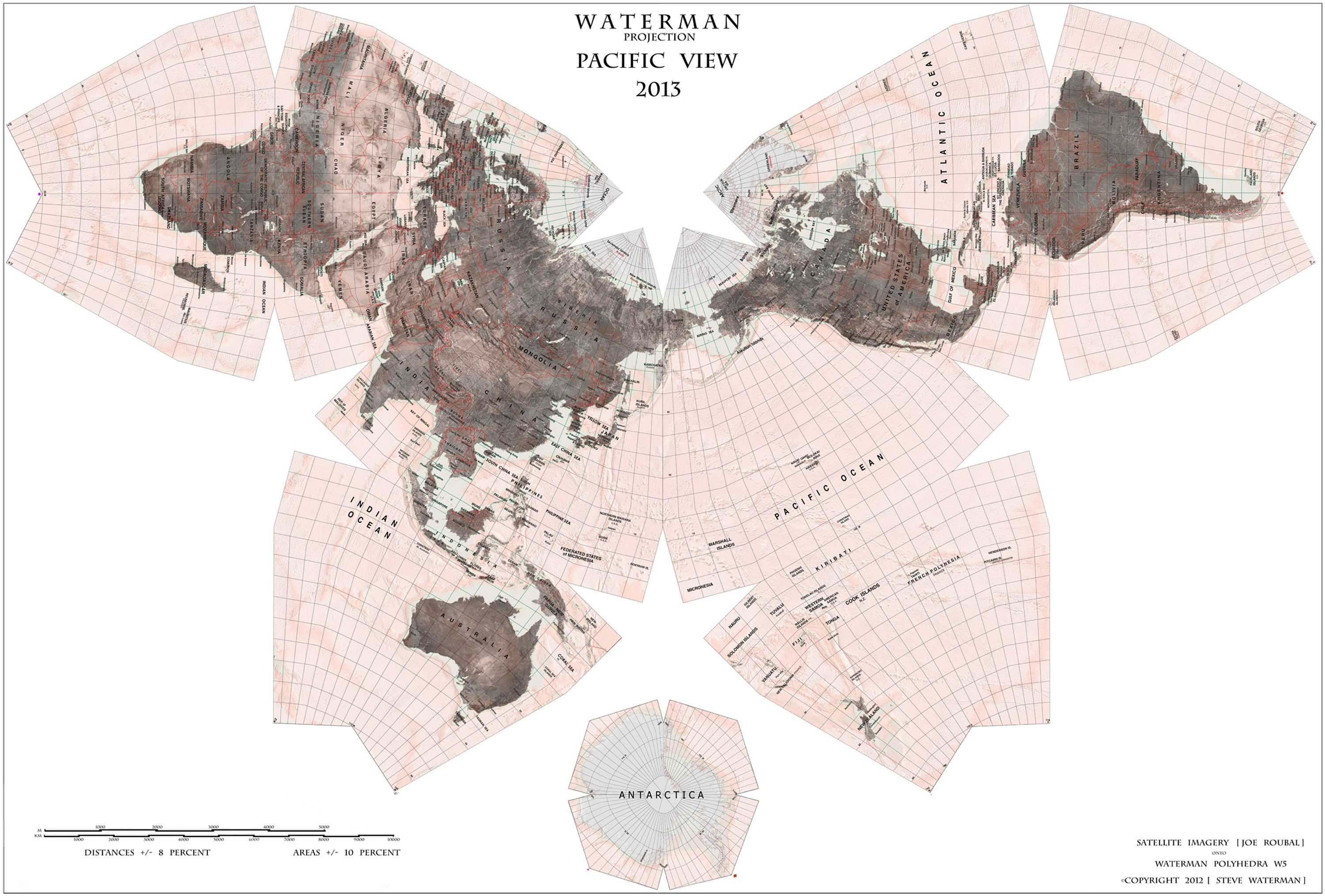
Waterman projection centered on Pacific, with Antarctica detached

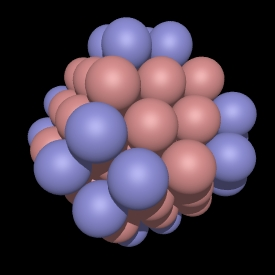
Waterman sphere cluster W5

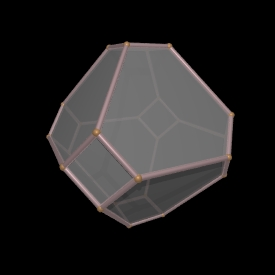
Waterman polyhedron w5

The Waterman "Butterfly" World Map is a map projection created by Steve Waterman. Waterman first published a map in this arrangement in 1996. The arrangement is an unfolding of a polyhedral globe with the shape of a truncated octahedron, evoking the butterfly map principle first developed by Bernard J.S. Cahill (1866–1944) in 1909. Cahill and Waterman maps can be shown in various profiles, typically linked at the north Pacific or north Atlantic oceans.

As Cahill was an architect, his approach tended toward forms that could be demonstrated physically, such as by his flattenable rubber-ball map. Waterman, on the other hand, derived his design from his work on close-packing of spheres. This involves connecting the sphere centers from cubic closest-packed spheres into a corresponding convex hull, as demonstrated in the accompanying graphics. These illustrate the W5 sphere cluster, W5 convex hull, and two Waterman projections from the W5 convex hull.

To project the sphere to the polyhedron, the Earth is divided into eight octants. Each meridian is drawn as three straight-line segments in its respective octant, each segment defined by its endpoints on two of four "Equal Line Delineations" defined by Waterman. These Equal Line Delineations are the North Pole, the northernmost polyhedron edge, the longest line parallel to the equator, and the equator itself. The intersections of all meridians with any one Equal Line Delineation are equally spaced, and the intersections of all parallels with any one meridian are equally spaced. Waterman chose the W5 Waterman polyhedron and central meridian of 20°W to minimize interrupting major land masses. Popko notes the projection can be gnomonic too. The two methods yield very similar results.

Like Buckminster Fuller's 1943 Dymaxion Projection, an octahedral butterfly map can show all the continents uninterrupted if its octants are divided at a suitable meridian (in this case 20°W) and are joined, for example, at the North Atlantic, as in the 1996 version.

== See also ==
- List of map projections
- Waterman polyhedron
- Bernard J.S. Cahill
- World map
