= Richard Henry Major =

British geographer and map librarian

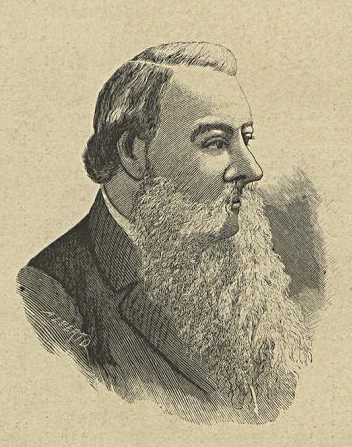
Richard Henry Major

Richard Henry Major (October 3, 1818 – June 25, 1891) was a geographer and map librarian who curated the map collection of the British Museum from 1844 until his retirement in 1880.

== Biography ==
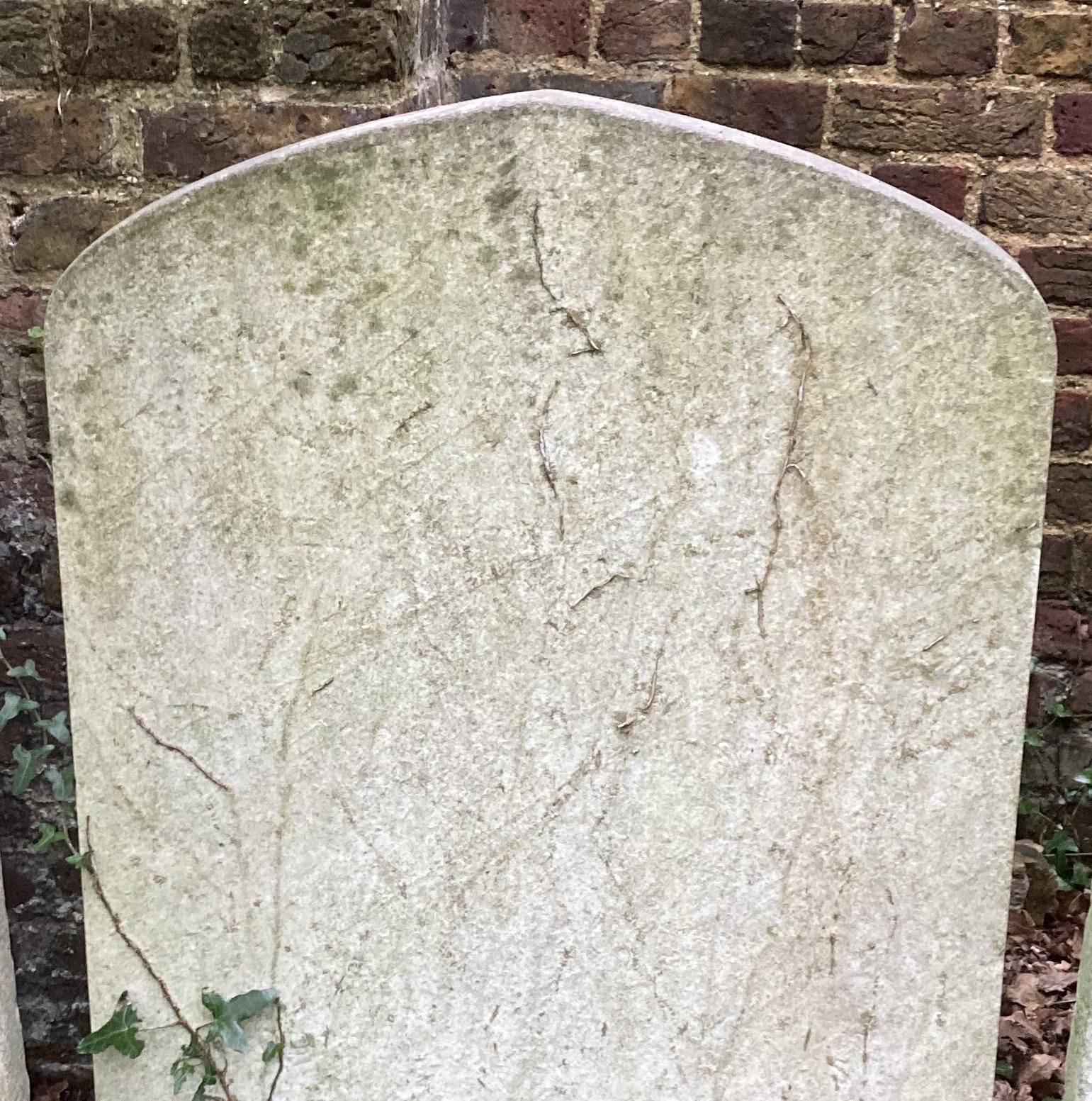
Grave of Richard Henry Major in Highgate Cemetery

Major was born in Shoreditch in 1818 to Richard Major, a surgeon, and his wife Elizabeth. His father died when he was three years old and he was brought up with his elder brother by his paternal grandfather. He was educated at Merchant Taylors' School and after working as a clerk joined the British Museum in 1844 under the patronage of Sir Henry Ellis.

In 1847 Major married Sarah Elizabeth Thorn (c.1814–1890), an artist, who worked professionally as both Thorn and Major, illustrating some of her husband's publications. In 1854 he was elected fellow of the Society of Antiquaries and was active in it for the next twenty years. He also became a fellow of the Royal Geographical Society in 1845, where he was honorary secretary from 1866 to 1881 and vice-president between 1881 and 1884. From 1849 until 1858, he was the Secretary of the Hakluyt Society.

He was appointed keeper of the newly created department of maps and charts in the British Museum in 1867. Respiratory illness forced him to retire from the museum in 1880 and from active involvement in professional societies soon afterwards. He died on 25 June 1891 at his home, 51 Holland Road, Kensington, and was buried on the western side of Highgate Cemetery. The headstone on his grave (no.4953) is no longer readable.

Major published a number of books related to maps or documents of historical significance.

== Works ==
- Notes upon Russia: Being a Translation of the earliest Account of that Country, entitled Rerum Muscoviticarum commentarii, by the Baron Sigismund von Herberstein
- Early voyages to Terra Australia, now called Australia
- Further Facts Relating To The Early Discovery Of Australia With Supplementary Observations On The Same Subject
- The Discovery of Australia by the Portuguese in 1601
- Memoir on a mappemonde by Leonardo da Vinci, being the earliest map hitherto known containing the name of America
- The life of Prince Henry of Portugal surnamed the navigator and its results: Comprising the discovery, within one century, of half the world. With new facts in the discovery of the Atlantic Islands. A refutation of French claims to priority in discovery. Portuguese Knowledge (subsequently lost) of the Nile lakes; and the history of the naming of America.
- The voyages of the Venetian brothers, Nicolò & Antonio Zeno, to the northern seas in the XIVth century : comprising the latest known accounts of the lost colony of Greenland and of the Northmen in America before Columbus
- India in the fifteenth century : being a collection of narratives of voyages to India, in the century preceding the Portuguese discovery of the Cape of Good Hope; from Latin, Persian, Russian, and Italian sources, now first translated into English
