= World map =

Map of most or all of the surface of the Earth

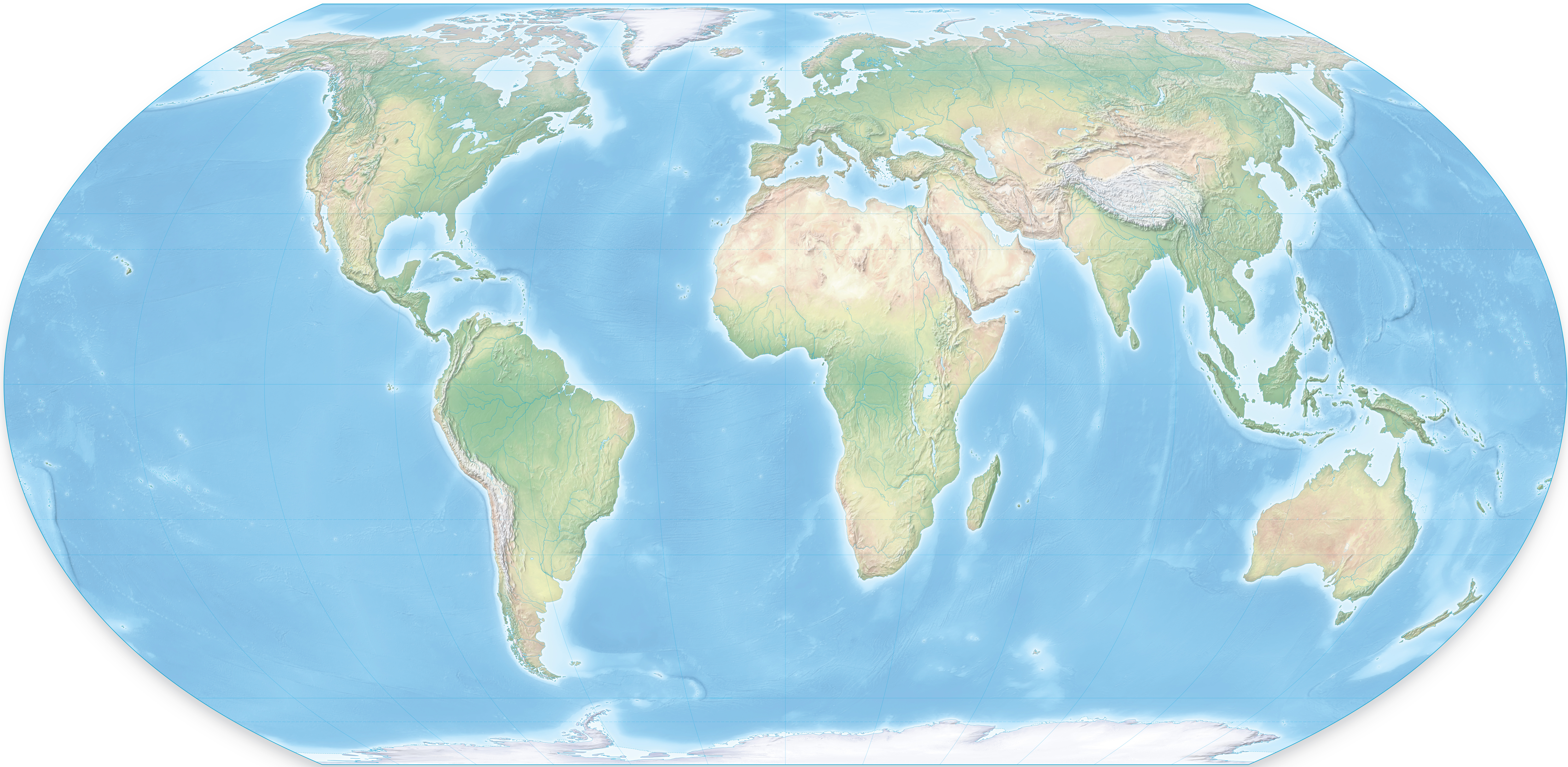
The Equal Earth projection, which preserves relative size everywhere with a low level of shape distortion except for very near to the poles

NASA's Blue Marble Next Generation, a composite of cloud-free satellite images

A world map is a map of most or all of the surface of Earth. World maps, because of their scale, must deal with the problem of projection. Maps rendered in two dimensions by necessity distort the display of the three-dimensional surface of the Earth. While this is true of any map, these distortions reach extremes in a world map. Many techniques have been developed to present world maps that address diverse technical and aesthetic goals.

Charting a world map requires global knowledge of the Earth, its oceans, and its continents. From prehistory through the Middle Ages, creating an accurate world map would have been impossible because less than half of Earth's coastlines and only a small fraction of its continental interiors were known to any culture. With exploration that began during the European Renaissance, knowledge of the Earth's surface accumulated rapidly, such that most of the world's coastlines had been mapped, at least roughly, by the mid-1700s and the continental interiors by the twentieth century.

Maps of the world generally focus either on political features or on physical features. Political maps emphasize territorial boundaries and human settlement. Physical maps show geographical features such as mountains, soil type, or land use. Geological maps show not only the surface, but characteristics of the underlying rock, fault lines, and subsurface structures. Choropleth maps use color hue and intensity to contrast differences between regions, such as demographic or economic statistics.

== Map projections ==
All world maps are based on one of several map projections, or methods of representing a globe on a plane. All projections distort geographic features, distances, and directions in some way. The various map projections that have been developed provide different ways of balancing accuracy and the unavoidable distortion inherent in making world maps.

Perhaps the best-known projection is the Mercator Projection, originally designed as a nautical chart.

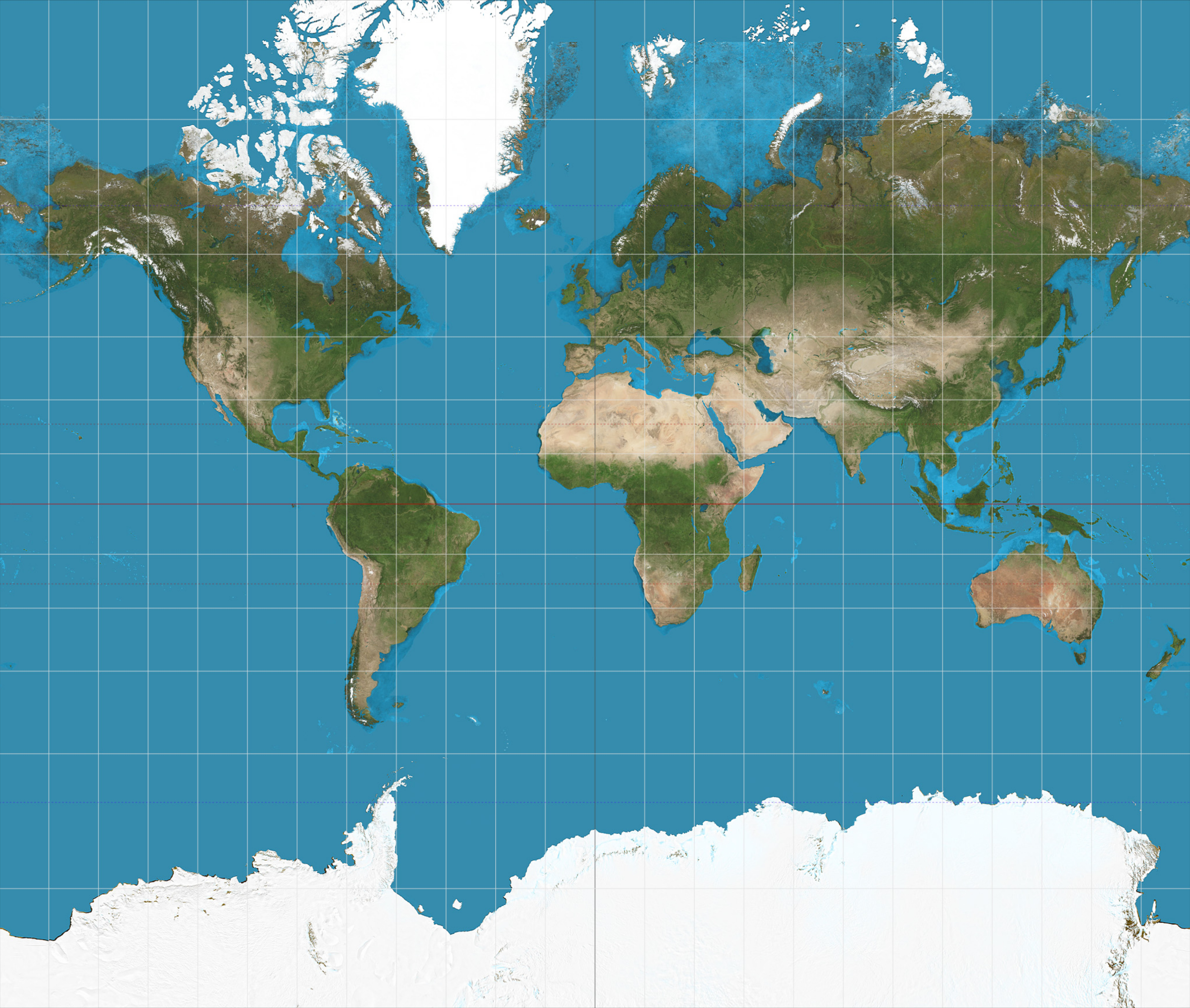
Mercator projection
(showing between 82°S and 82°N)

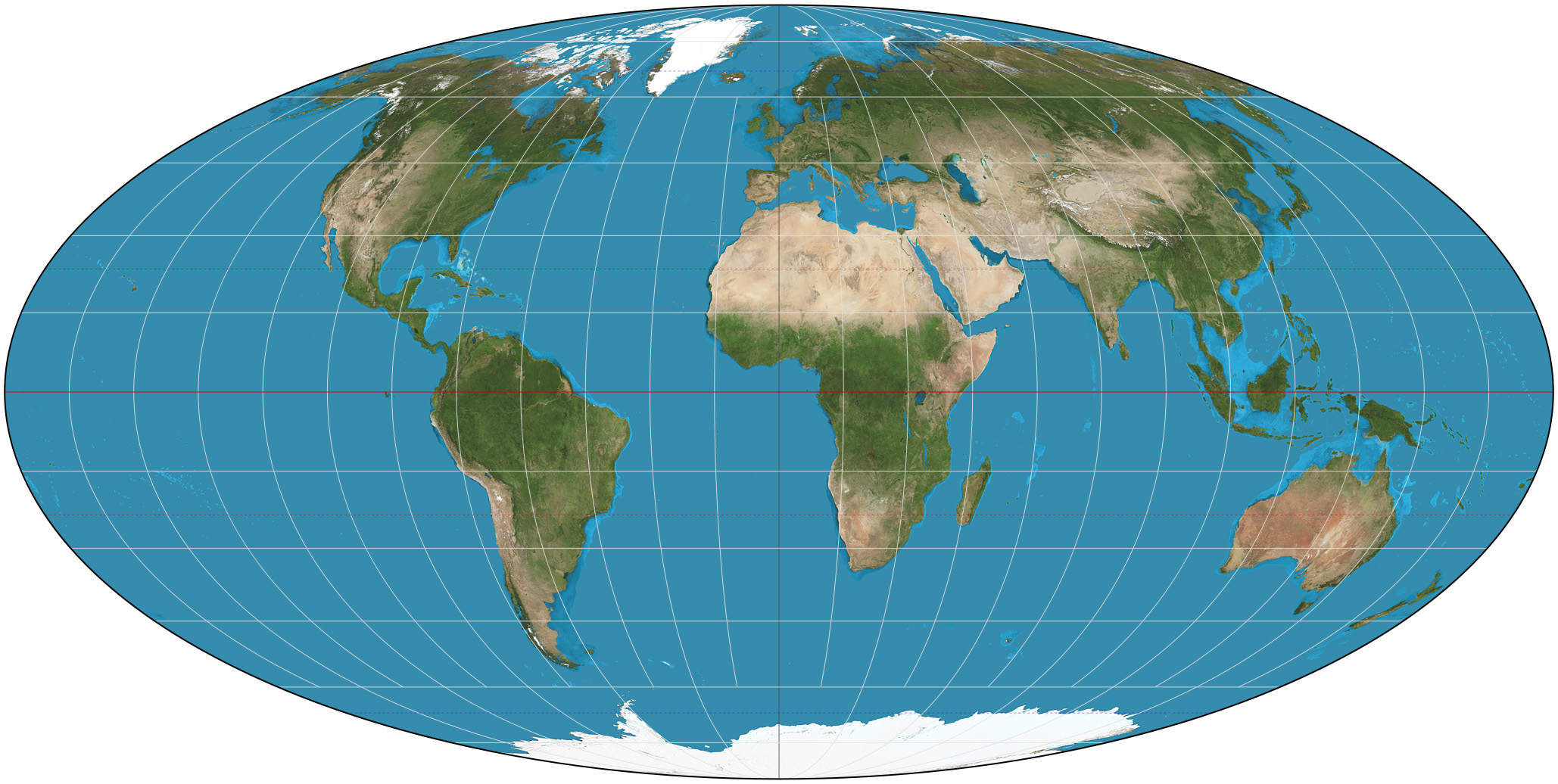
Mollweide projection

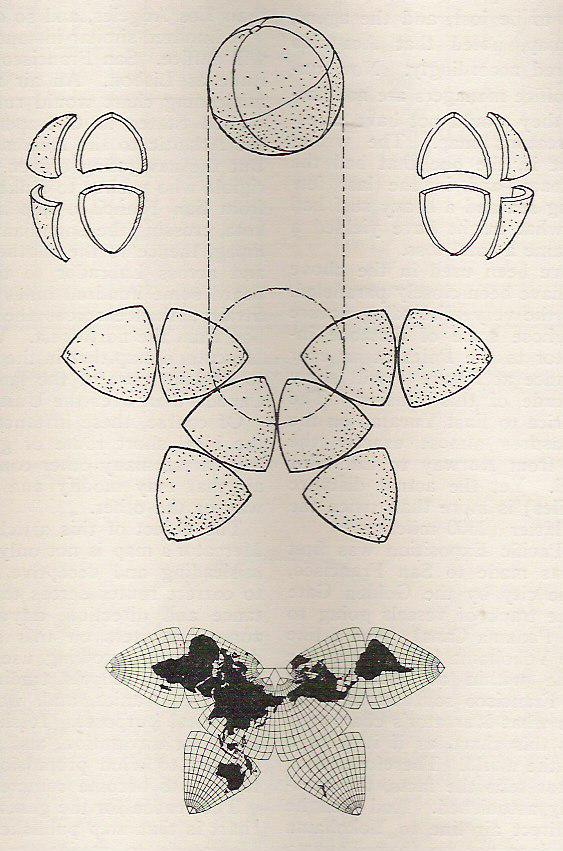
B.J.S. Cahill Butterfly Map, 1909, from 1919 pamphlet

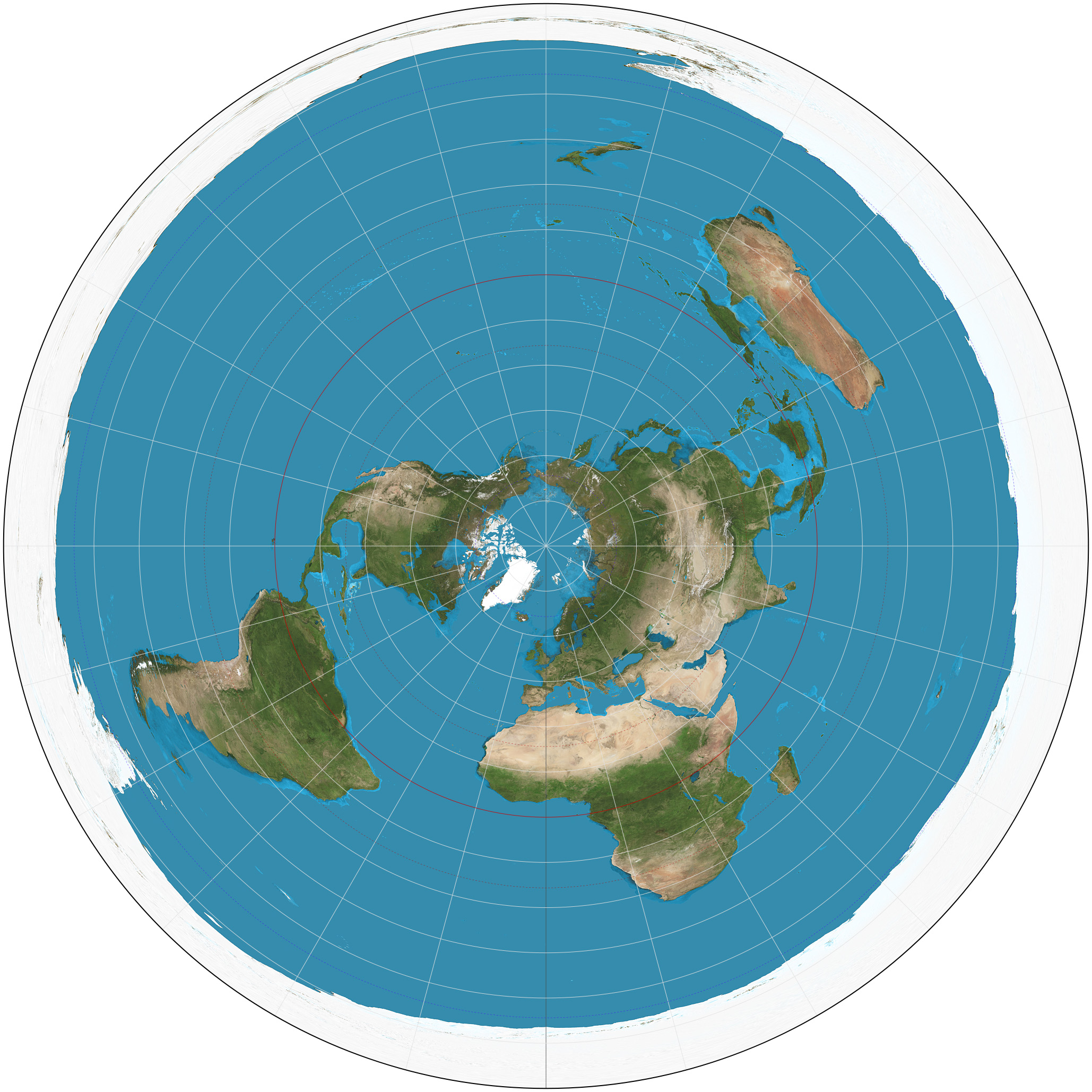
Polar azimuthal equidistant projection

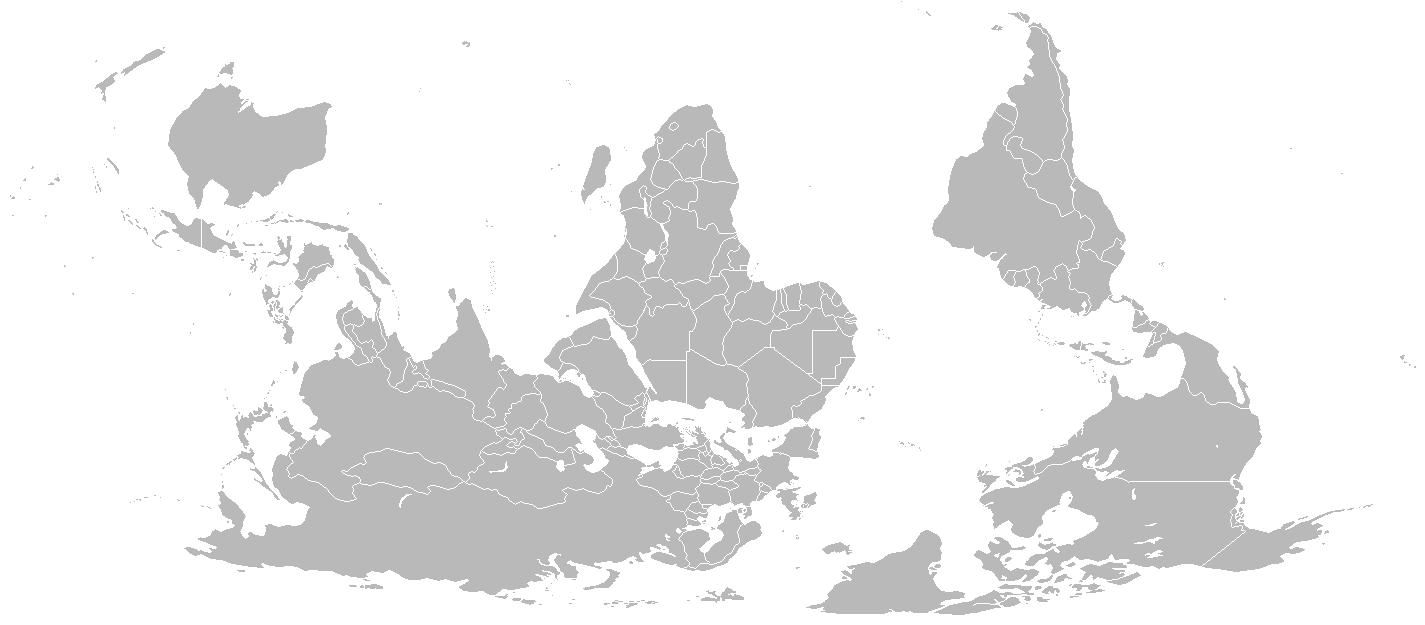
A south-up map

Pacific-centric map
(more commonly used in East Asian and Oceania countries)

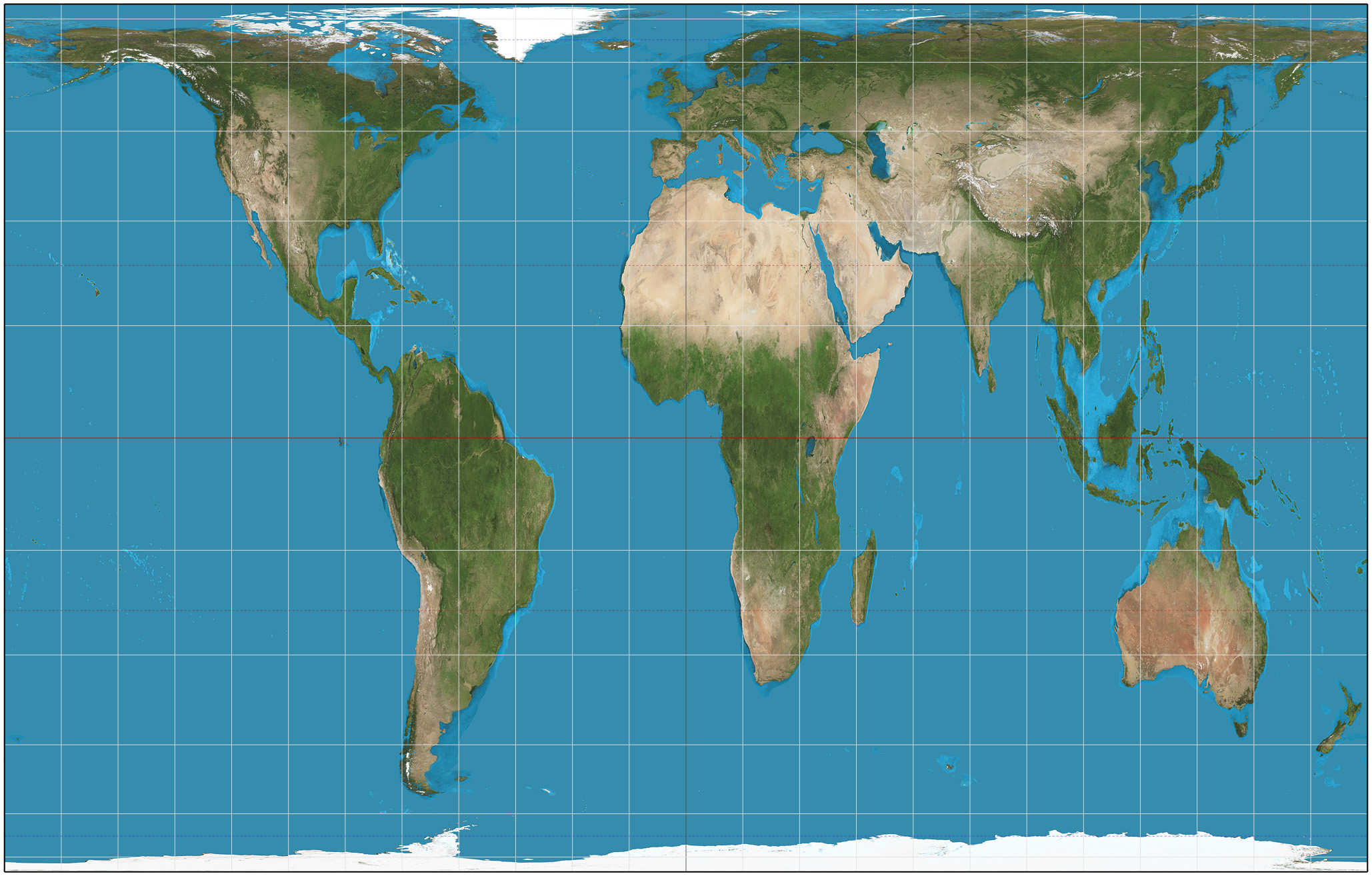
Gall–Peters projection, an equal-area map projection

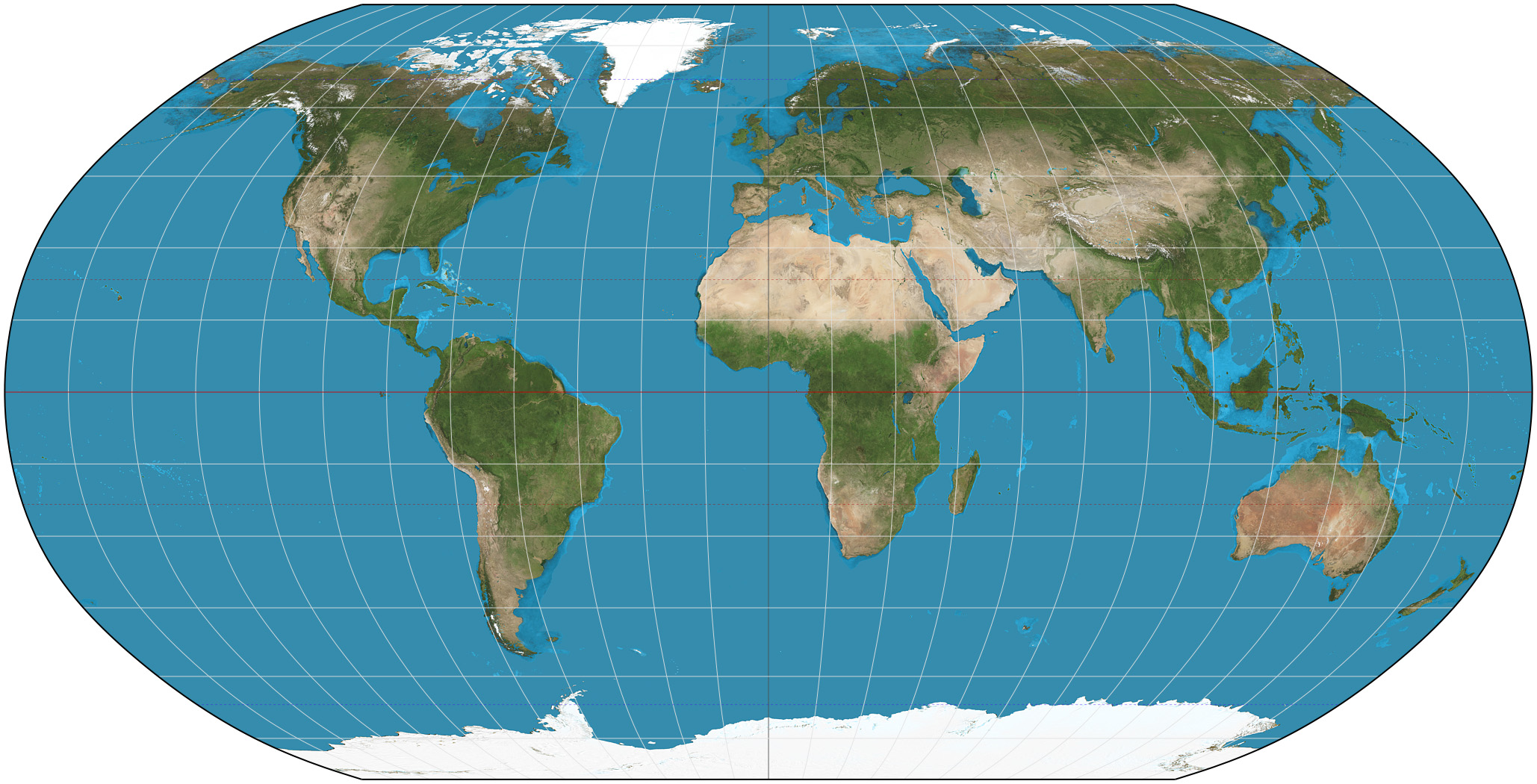
Robinson projection, formerly used by National Geographic Society

== Thematic maps ==
A thematic map shows geographical information about one or a few focused subjects. These maps "can portray physical, social, political, cultural, economic, sociological, agricultural, or any other aspects of a city, state, region, nation, or continent".

Clickable world map
(with climate classification)

A simple political map of the world

A simple physical map of the world

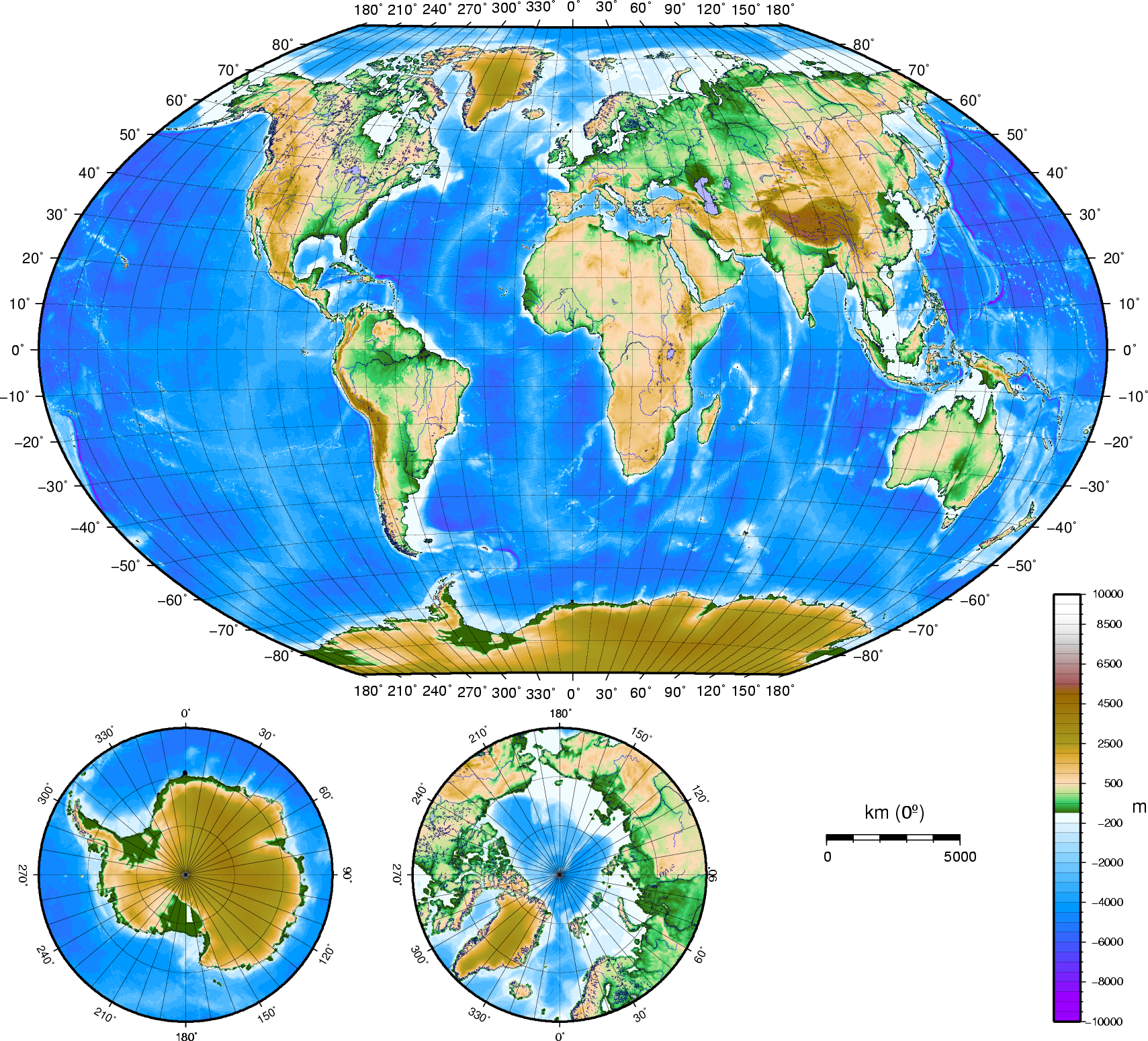
Topographical map of the world

Countries by GNI per capita growth

United Nations Human Development Index by country as of 2023

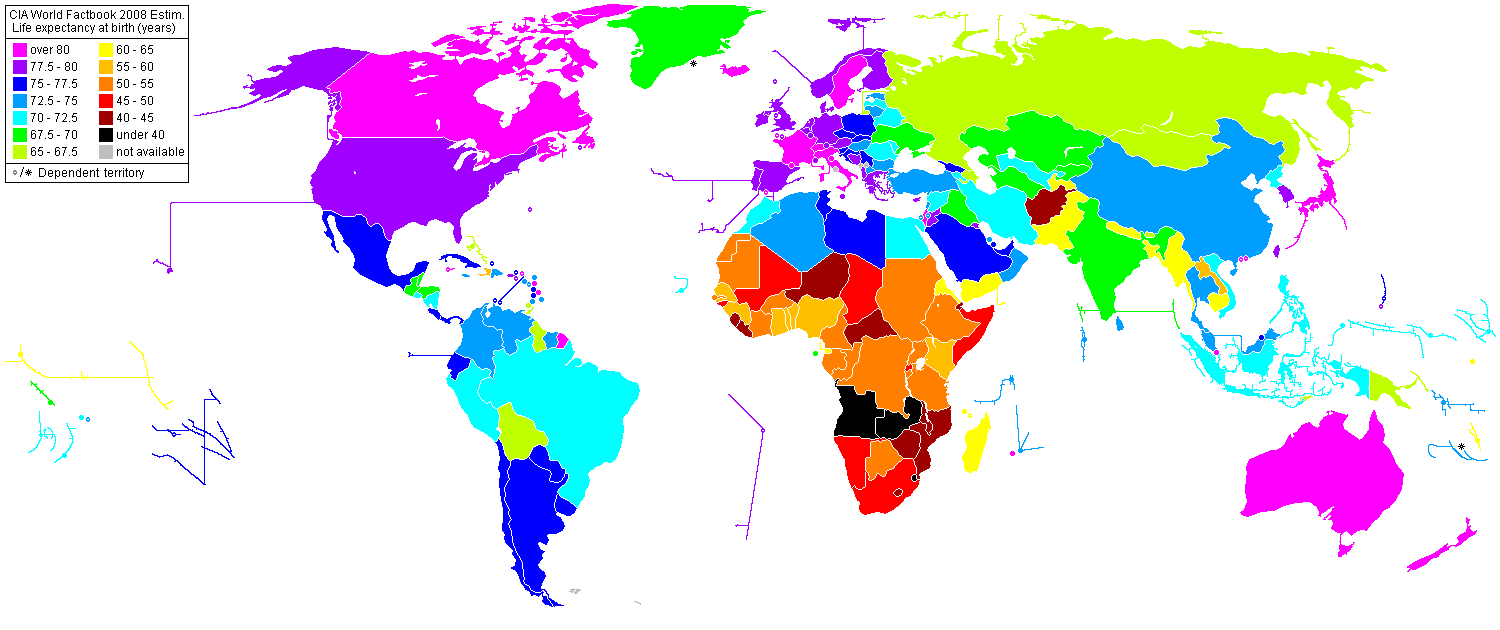
World map showing life expectancy

Population density
(people per km^{2}) by country

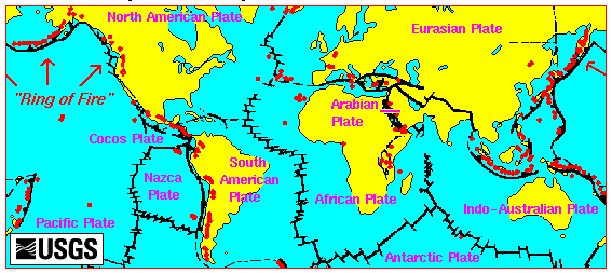
Volcano map

World map showing the continents circa 200 million years ago (Triassic period)

Satellite image of Earth at night

== Historical maps ==
Early world maps cover depictions of the world from the Iron Age to the Age of Discovery and the emergence of modern geography during the early modern period. Old maps provide information about places that were known in past times, as well as the philosophical and cultural basis of the map, which were often much different from modern cartography. Maps are one means by which scientists distribute their ideas and pass them on to future generations.

Hypothetical reconstruction of the world map of Anaximander (610–546 BC)

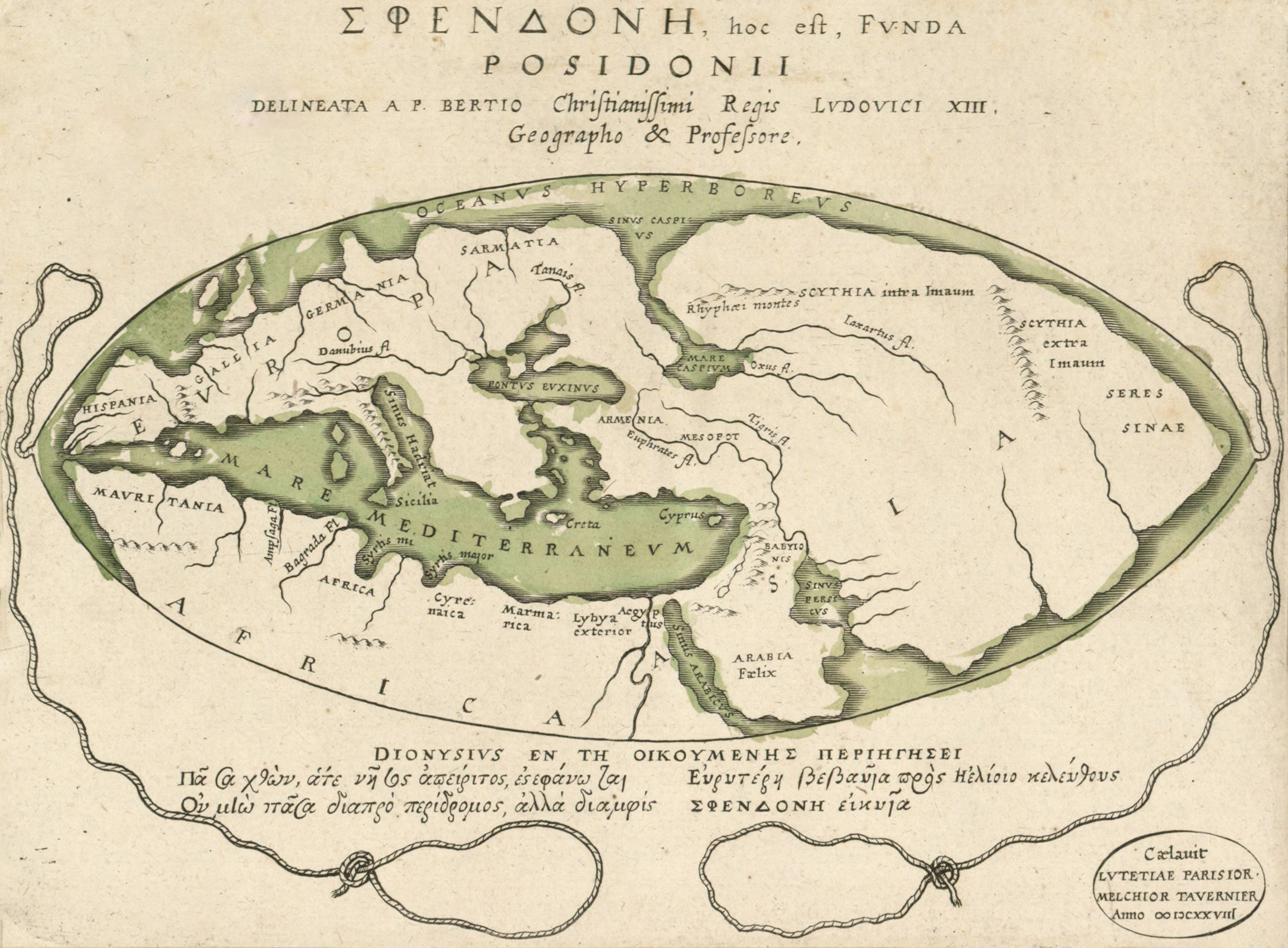
World map according to Posidonius (150–130 BC),
drawn in 1628

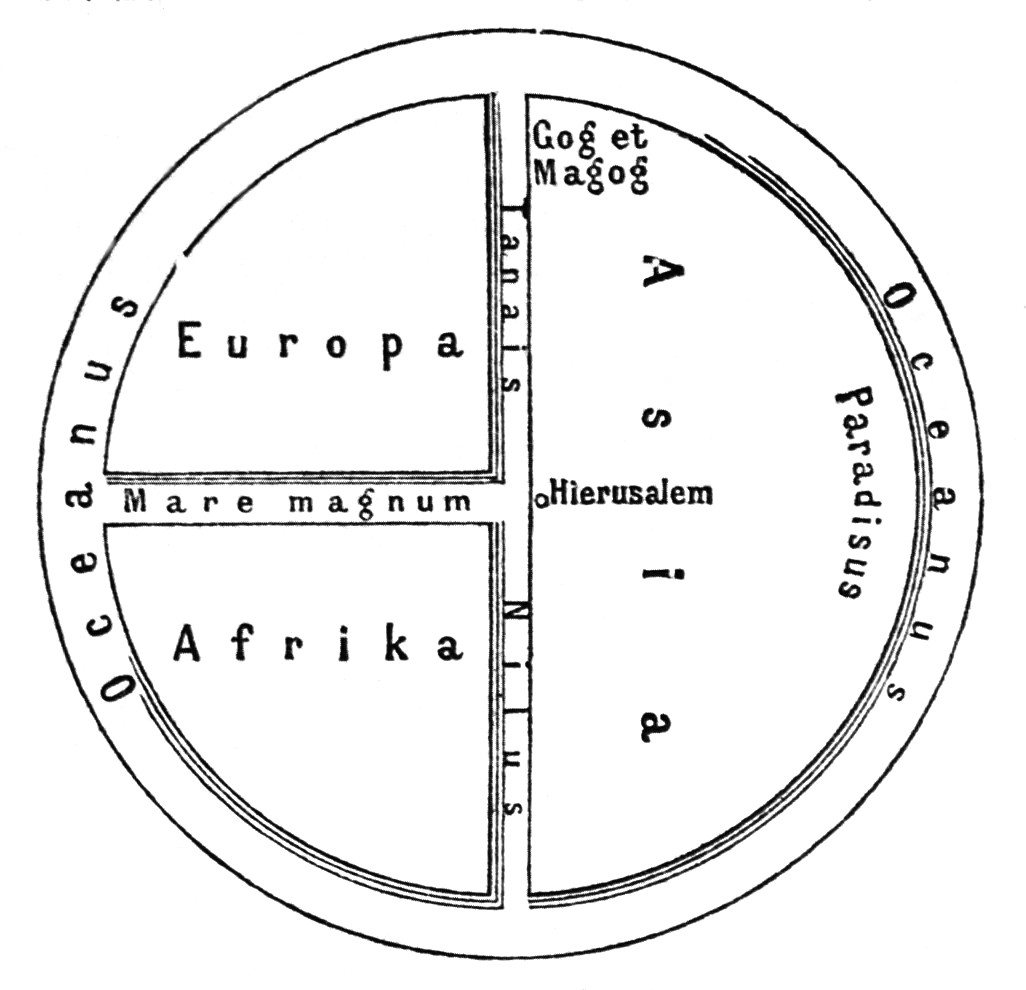
Ideal reconstruction of medieval T-and-O maps (from Meyers Konversationslexikon, 1890)
(Asia shown on the right)

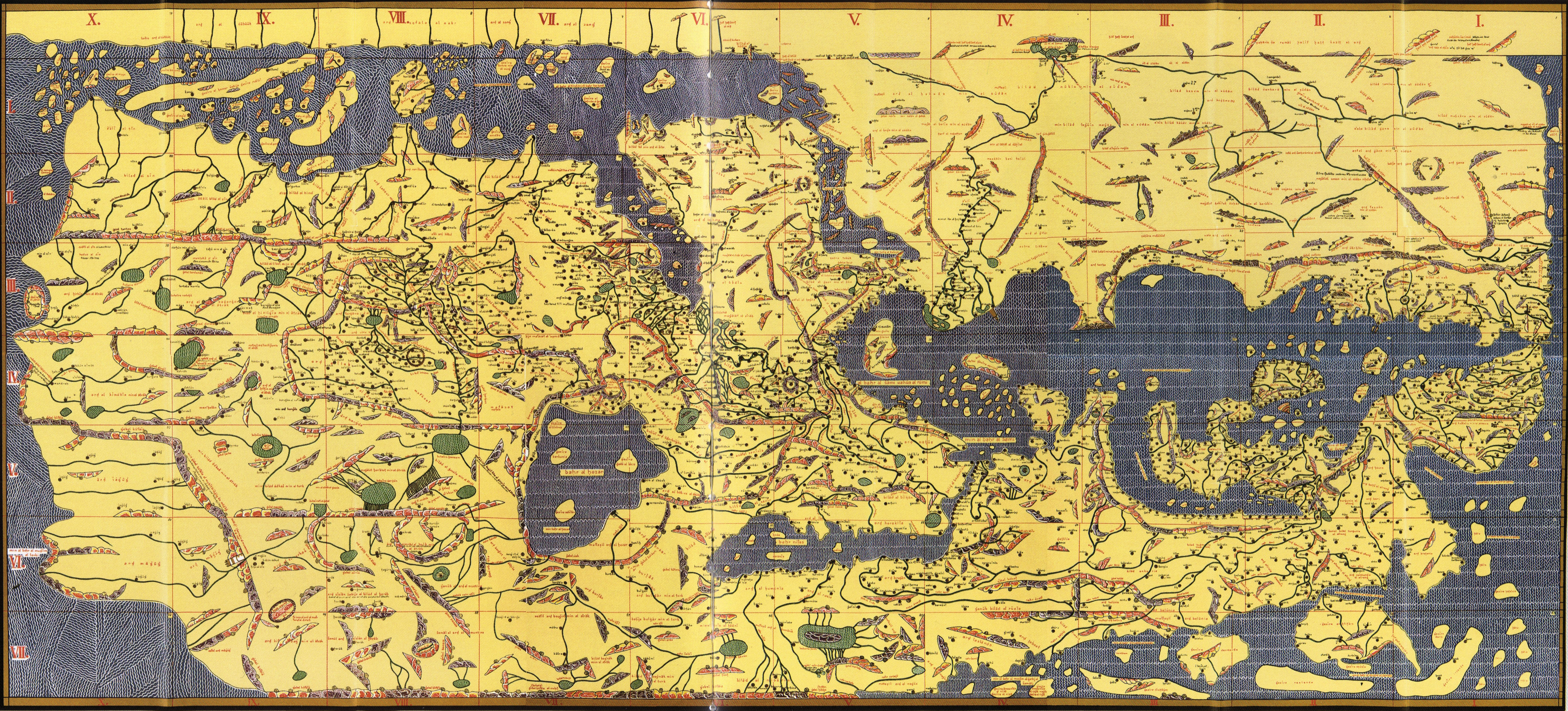
Tabula Rogeriana world map by Muhammad al-Idrisi in 1154
north is to the bottom

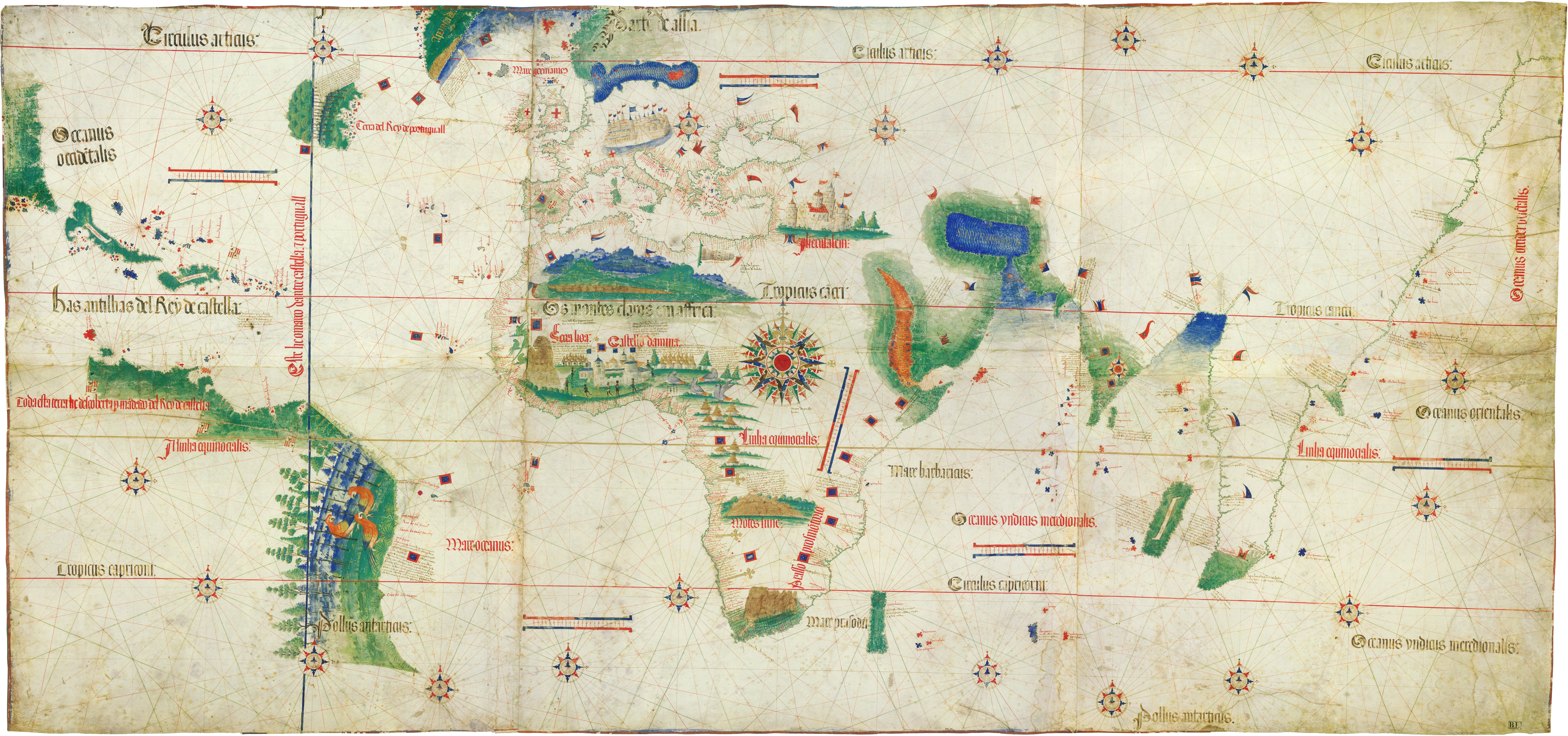
Cantino planisphere: Portuguese world map from 1502

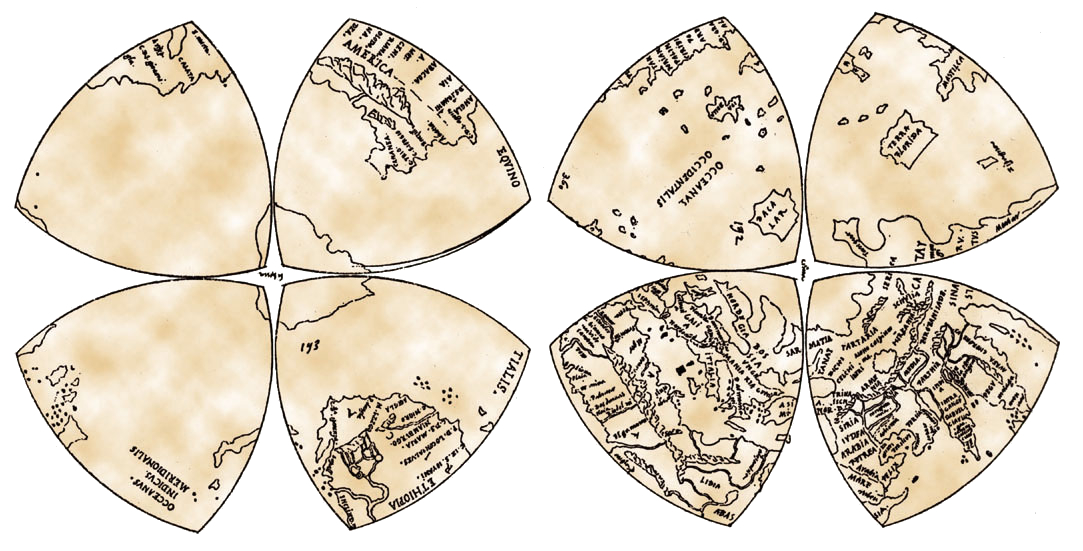
World map in Octant projection (1514), from Leonardo da Vinci's Windsor papers

The world, Abraham Ortelius's Typus Orbis Terrarum, first published in 1564

World map by Gerardus Mercator (1569), first map in the well-known Mercator projection

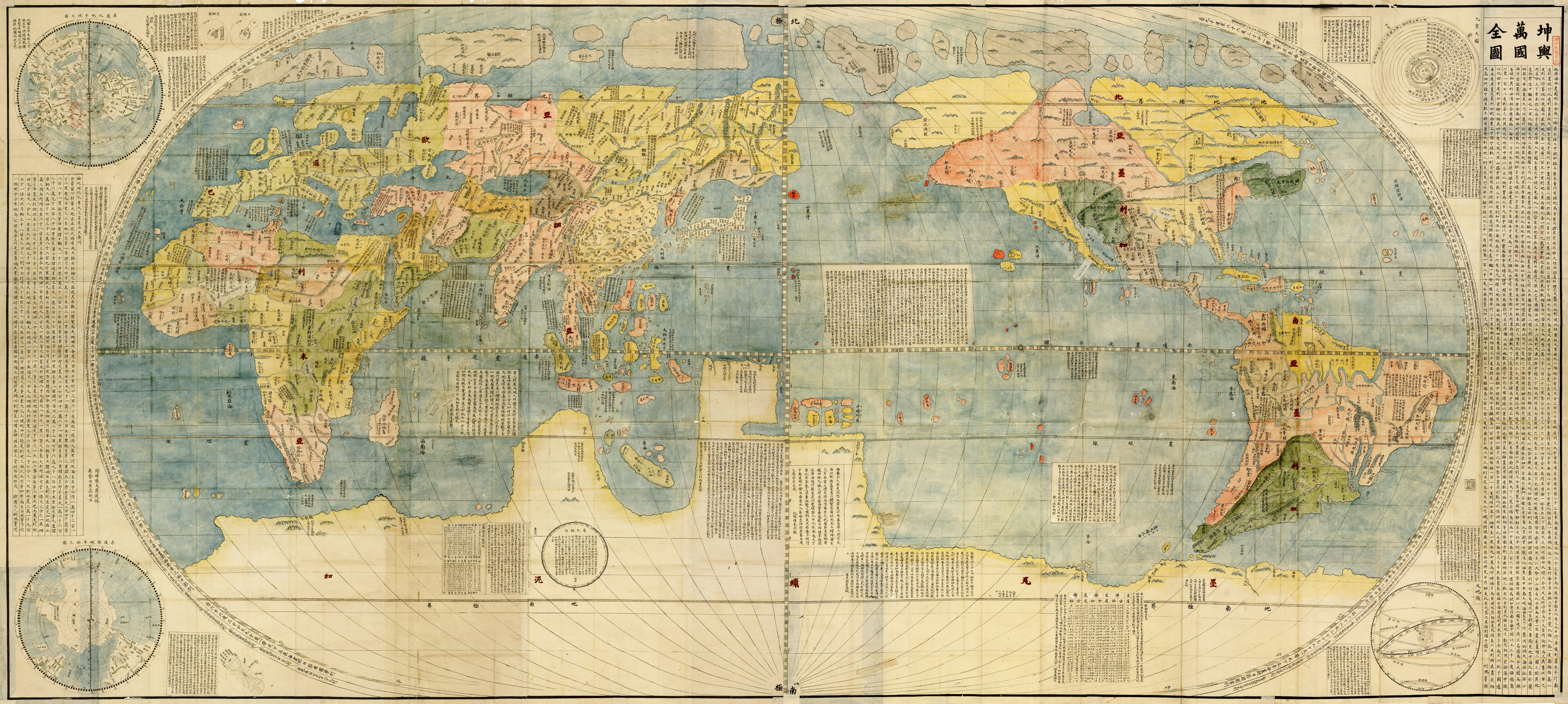
Kunyu Wanguo Quantu (Ming dynasty, 1602)

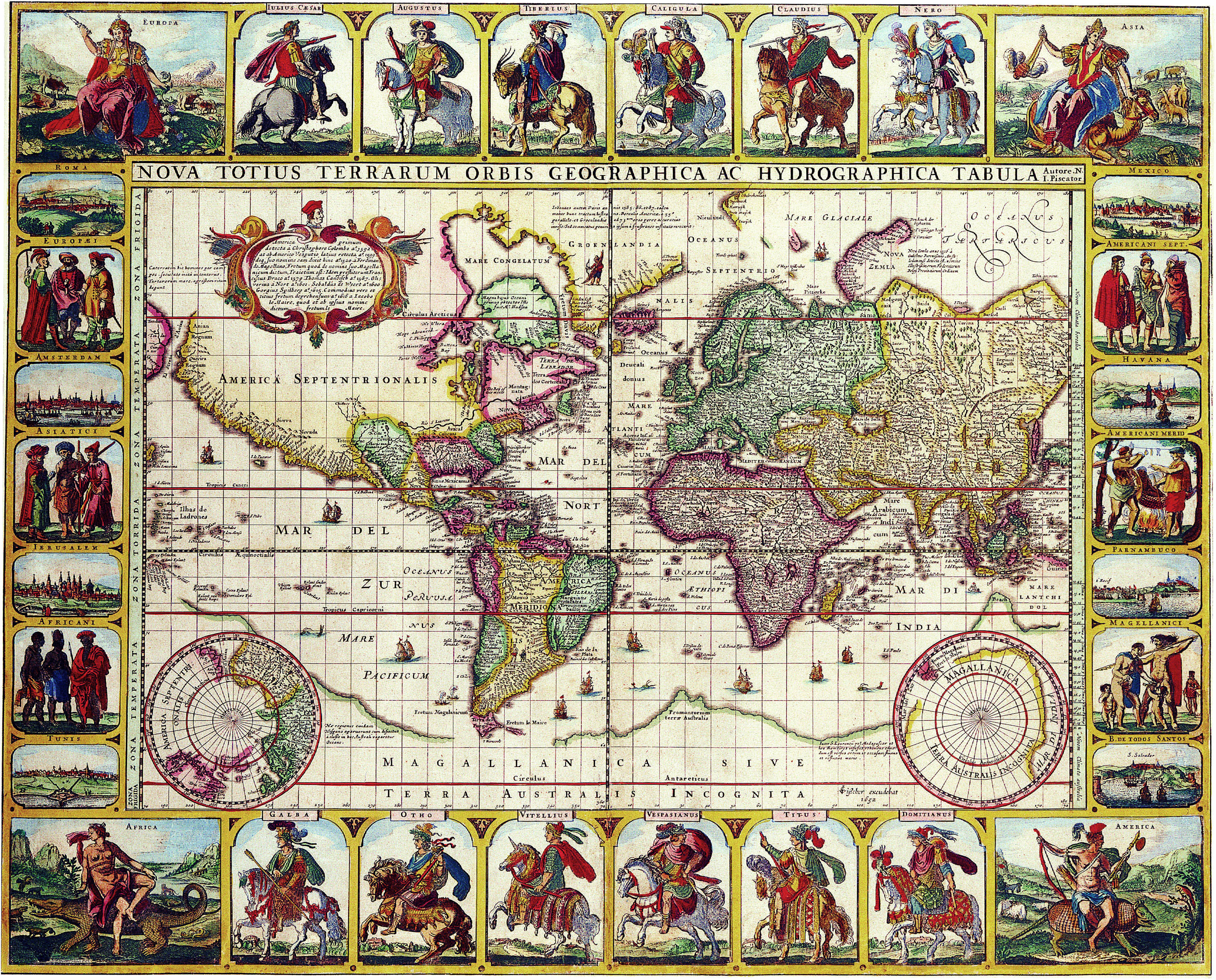
1652 world map
by Claes Janszoon Visscher

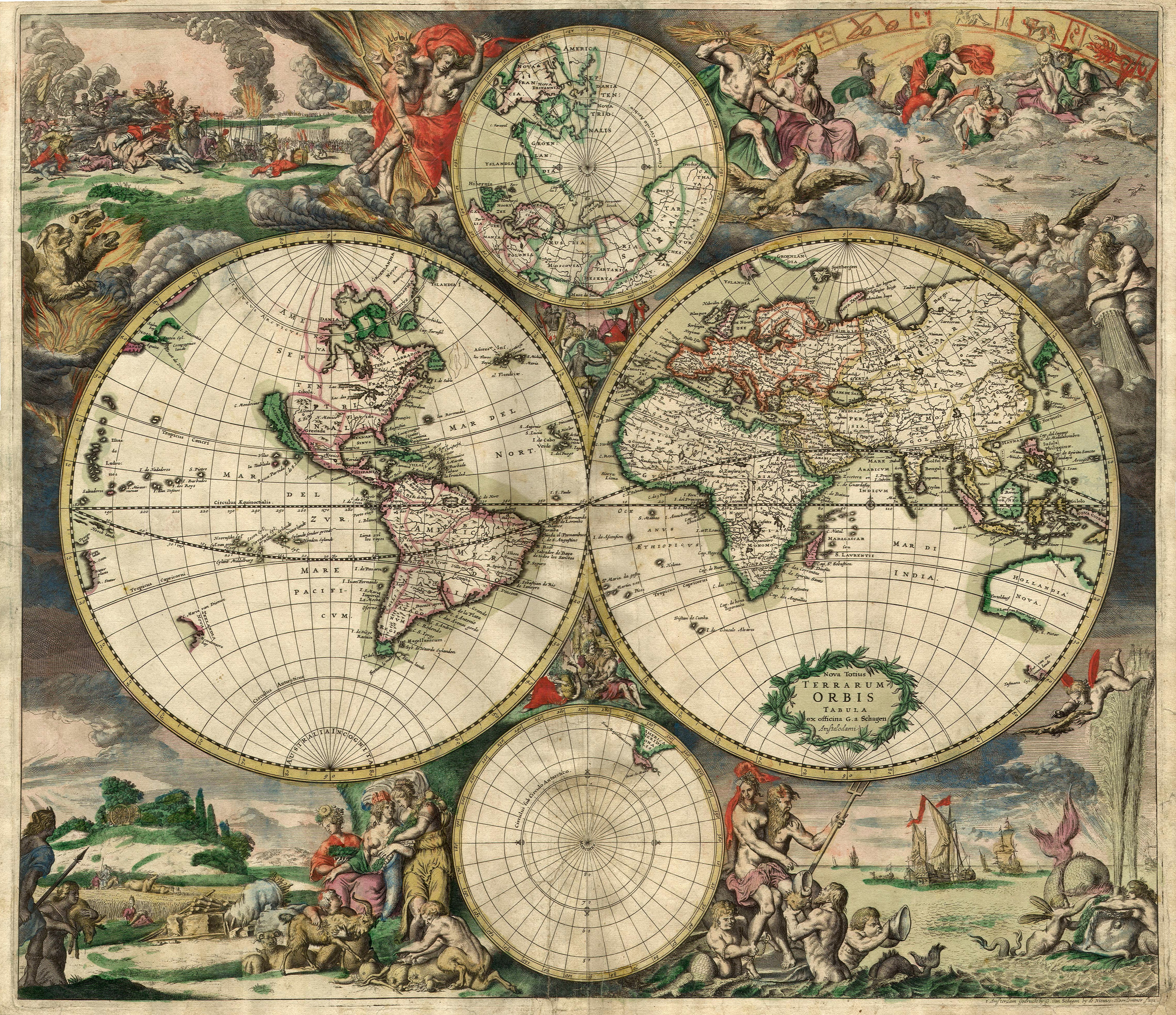
A historical map of the world by Gerard van Schagen, 1689

== See also ==
- Wikipedia's clickable world map
- Global Map – a set of digital maps developed by National Geospatial Information Authorities (NGIAs) in the world
- Globe – spherical models of Earth
- International Map of the World – an international project in the 20th century
- List of map projections
- List of world map changes
- Mappa mundi – medieval European maps of the world
- Rhumbline network – navigational aid drawn on maps
- Theorema Egregium – a geometric theorem
- Time zone
