= Waterman polyhedron =

Polyhedron related to sphere packing

In geometry, the Waterman polyhedra are a family of polyhedra discovered around 1990 by the mathematician Steve Waterman. A Waterman polyhedron is created by packing spheres according to the cubic close(st) packing (CCP), also known as the face-centered cubic (fcc) packing, then sweeping away the spheres that are farther from the center than a defined radius, then creating the convex hull of the sphere centers.

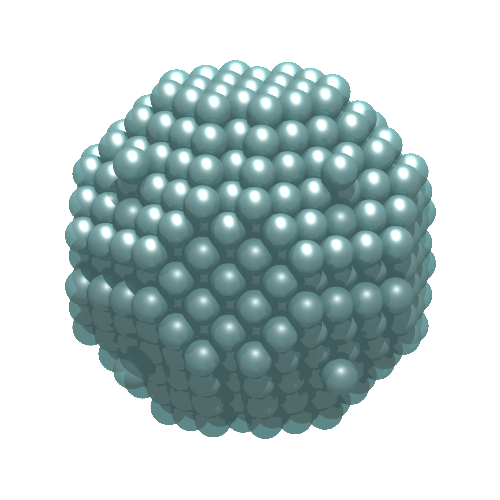
Cubic Close(st) Packed spheres with radius √24

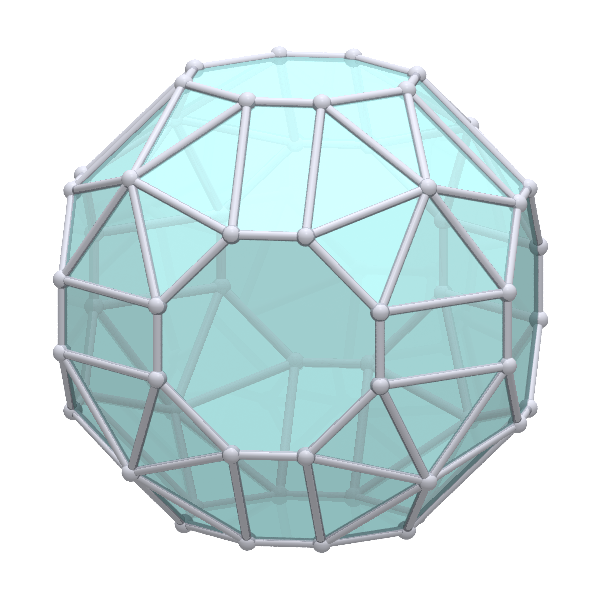
Corresponding Waterman polyhedron W24 Origin 1

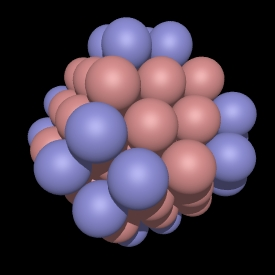
Waterman/fcc sphere cluster W5

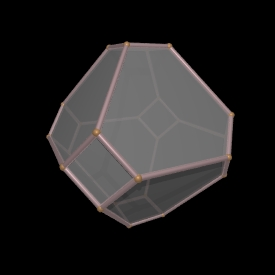
Waterman/fcc polyhedra interpretation of sphere cluster w5

Waterman polyhedra form a vast family of polyhedra. Some of them have a number of special properties such as multiple symmetries, or interesting and regular shapes. Others are less structured collection of faces formed from irregular convex polygons.

The most popular Waterman polyhedra are those with centers at the point (0,0,0) and built out of hundreds of polygons. Such polyhedra resemble spheres. In fact, the more faces a Waterman polyhedron has, the more it resembles its circumscribed sphere in volume and total area.

With each point of 3D space we can associate a family of Waterman polyhedra with different values of radii of the circumscribed spheres. Therefore, from a mathematical point of view we can consider Waterman polyhedra as 4D spaces W(x, y, z, r), where x, y, z are coordinates of a point in 3D, and r is a positive number greater than 1.

== Seven origins of cubic close(st) packing (CCP) ==
There can be seven origins defined in CCP, where n = {1, 2, 3, …}:

- Origin 1: offset 0,0,0, radius $\sqrt{2n}$
- Origin 2: offset 1/2,1/2,0, radius $\tfrac12\sqrt{2+4n}$
- Origin 3: offset 1/3,1/3,2/3, radius $\tfrac13\sqrt{6(n+1)}$
- Origin 3*: offset 1/3,1/3,1/3, radius $\tfrac13\sqrt{3+6n}$
- Origin 4: offset 1/2,1/2,1/2, radius $\tfrac12\sqrt{3+8(n-1)}$
- Origin 5: offset 0,0,1/2, radius $\tfrac12\sqrt{1+4n}$
- Origin 6: offset 1,0,0, radius $\sqrt{1+2(n-1)}$

Depending on the origin of the sweeping, a different shape and resulting polyhedron are obtained.

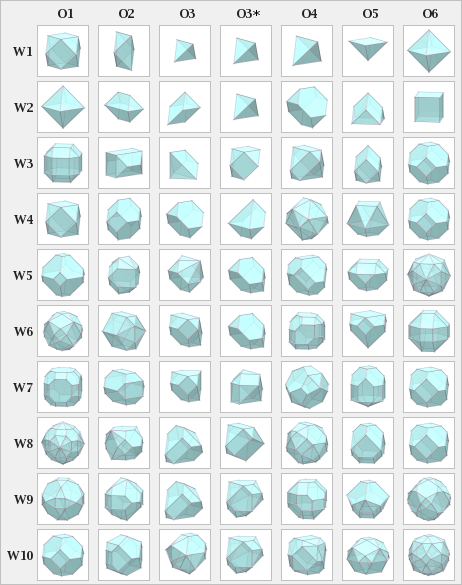

== Relation to Platonic and Archimedean solids ==
Some Waterman polyhedra create Platonic solids and Archimedean solids. For this comparison of Waterman polyhedra they are normalized, e.g. W2 O1 has a different size or volume than W1 O6, but has the same form as an octahedron.

=== Platonic solids ===
- Tetrahedron: W1 O3*, W2 O3*, W1 O3, W1 O4
- Octahedron: W2 O1, W1 O6
- Cube: W2 O6
- Icosahedron and dodecahedron have no representation as Waterman polyhedra.

=== Archimedean solids ===
- Cuboctahedron: W1 O1, W4 O1
- Truncated octahedron: W10 O1
- Truncated tetrahedron: W4 O3, W2 O4
- The other Archimedean solids have no representation as Waterman polyhedra.

The W7 O1 might be mistaken for a truncated cuboctahedron, as well W3 O1 = W12 O1 mistaken for a rhombicuboctahedron, but those Waterman polyhedra have two edge lengths and therefore do not qualify as Archimedean solids.

== Generalized Waterman polyhedra ==
Generalized Waterman polyhedra are defined as the convex hull derived from the point set of any spherical extraction from a regular lattice.

Included is a detailed analysis of the following 10 lattices – bcc, cuboctahedron, diamond, fcc, hcp, truncated octahedron, rhombic dodecahedron, simple cubic, truncated tet tet, truncated tet truncated octahedron cuboctahedron.

Each of the 10 lattices were examined to isolate those particular origin points that manifested a unique polyhedron, as well as possessing some minimal symmetry requirement. From a viable origin point, within a lattice, there exists an unlimited series of polyhedra. Given its proper sweep interval, then there is a one-to-one correspondence between each integer value and a generalized Waterman polyhedron.
