= Cairo fire =

1952 anti-British riots in downtown Cairo, Egypt

Cairo fire Black Saturday
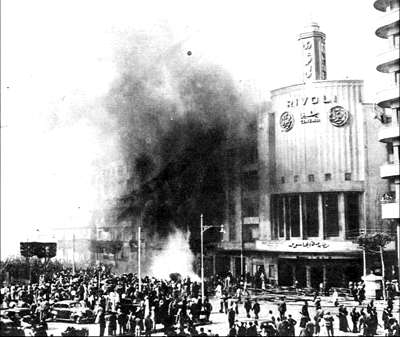
- Rivoli Cinema on fire
- Location: 30°3′29″N 31°13′44″E; Cairo, Egypt
- Date: 26 January 1952; 12:30 pm – 11 pm (UTC+02:00)
- Target: Buildings owned by or associated with Europeans, especially the British
- Attack type: Riots, arson
- Deaths: 26 (inc. 13 Britons)
- Injuries: 552
- Perpetrator: Unknown (several theories)

The Cairo Fire (Arabic: حريق القاهرة), also known as Black Saturday, was a series of riots that took place on 26 January 1952, marked by the burning and looting of some 750 buildings—retail shops, cafes, cinemas, hotels, restaurants, theatres, nightclubs, and the city's Casino Opera —in downtown Cairo. The direct trigger of the riots was the Battle of Ismailia, an attack on an Egyptian police installation in Ismaïlia by British forces on 25 January, in which roughly 50 auxiliary policemen were killed.

The spontaneous anti-British protests that followed these deaths were quickly seized upon by organized elements in the crowd, who burned and ransacked large sectors of Cairo amidst the unexplained absence of security forces. The fire is thought by some to have signalled the end of the Kingdom of Egypt. The perpetrators of the Cairo Fire remain unknown to this day, and the truth about this important event in modern Egyptian history has yet to be established.

The disorder that befell Cairo during the 1952 fire has been compared to the chaos that followed the anti-government protests of 25 January 2011, which saw demonstrations take place amidst massive arson and looting, an inexplicable withdrawal of the police, and organized prison-breaking.

== Background ==
In 1952, the British occupation of Egypt was entering its 70th year, but by then was limited to the Suez Canal zone. On the morning of 25 January 1952, Brigadier Kenneth Exham, the British commander in the region, issued an order to Egyptian policemen in Ismaïlia, demanding that they surrender their weapons and leave the canal zone. Exham's order came in response to attacks against British forces by fedayeen groups, which were being supported by Egyptian policemen. The Ismailia Governorate refused the British request, a refusal that was reiterated by interior minister Fouad Serageddin.

On January 25 1952, 7,000 British Army troops surrounded an Egyptian police station in Ismaïlia, which was harboring fedayeen that had attacked British forces. When a shot was fired at the British from inside the station, the British attacked and captured it after a fierce firefight. Of the 700 auxiliary policemen inside the station, 50 were killed and 80 wounded during the confrontation. All surviving Egyptian police officers were taken captive by British forces after the battle. The British also suffered minor casualties during the engagement as well.

== Events ==
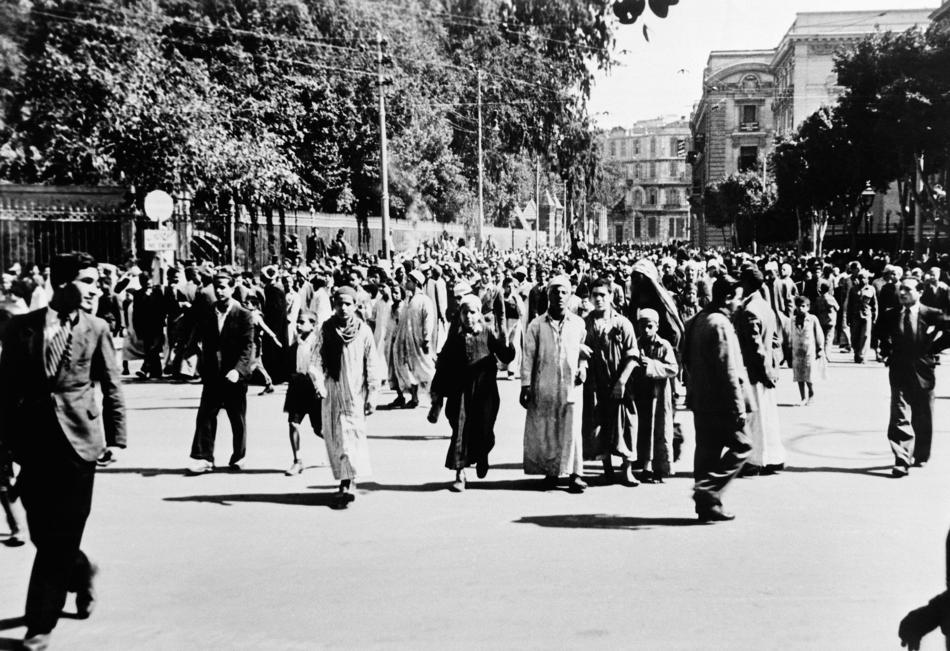
Demonstration taking place at Opera Square. January 25, 1952

The following day, news of the confrontation in Ismaïlia reached Cairo, provoking the ire of the Egyptian public. The unrest began at Almaza Airport, when workers there refused to provide services to four British aeroplanes. It was followed by a police demonstration in the Abbaseya barracks, who wished to express their solidarity with their dead and captured colleagues in Ismaïlia. Protesters then headed towards the university building, where they were joined by students. Together they marched towards the prime minister's office to demand that Egypt break its diplomatic relations with the United Kingdom and declare war on Britain. Abdul Fattah Hassan, the Minister of Social Affairs, told them that the Wafdist government wished to do so, but faced opposition from King Farouk I. As a result, protesters went to Abdeen Palace where they were joined by students from Al-Azhar. The crowd expressed its discontent towards the king, his supporters and the British.

The first act of arson took place in Opera Square, with the burning of Casino Opera entertainment club. The fire spread to Shepheard's Hotel, the Automobile Club, Barclays Bank, as well as other shops, corporate offices, movie theaters, hotels and banks. Fueled by anti-British and anti-Western sentiment, the mob concentrated on British-owned properties along with establishments with foreign connections, as well as buildings popularly associated with Western influence. Nightclubs and other establishments frequented by King Farouk I were equally targeted. The fires also reached the neighbourhoods of Faggala, Daher, and Citadel, as well as Tahrir Square and Cairo Train Station Square. Due to the prevailing chaos, theft and looting occurred, until the Royal Egyptian Army arrived shortly before sunset and managed to restore order. The Army was alerted belatedly, after most of the damage had already occurred.

== Damage ==
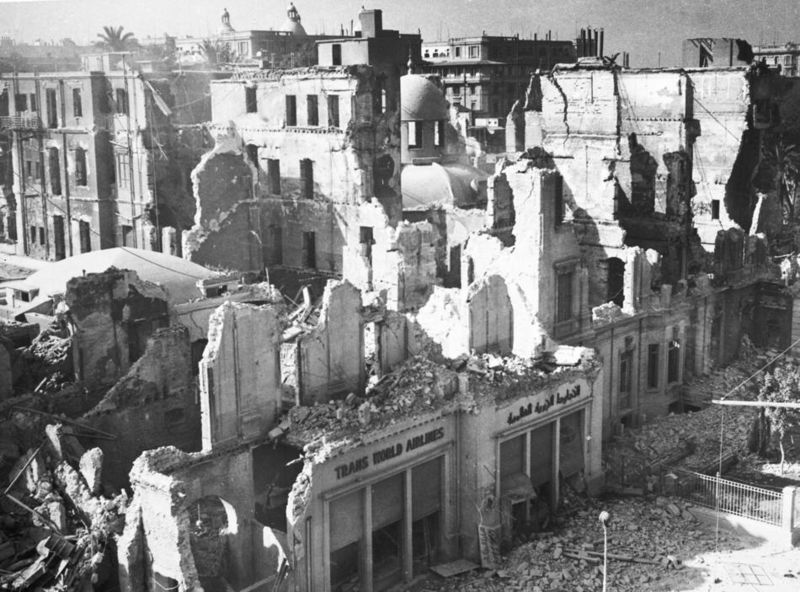
In the centre that was left of the Shepheard's Hotel on Jan. 27, 1952, after it was burned the previous day by rioters. In the foreground are the wrecked offices of Trans World Airlines

Most of the destruction, the extent of which was unforeseen by everyone, occurred between 12:30 pm and 11 pm. A total of £3.4 million damage was done to British and foreign property. Nearly 300 shops were destroyed, including some of Egypt's most famous department stores, such as Cicurel, Omar Effendi and the Salon Vert. The damage tally also included 30 corporate offices, 13 hotels (among which Shepheard's, Metropolitan and Victoria), 40 movie theaters (including Rivoli, Radio, Metro, Diana, and Miami), eight auto shows, 10 firearms shops, 73 coffeehouses and restaurants (including Groppi's), 92 bars and 16 social clubs. As for the human casualties, 26 people died and 552 suffered injuries such as burns and bone fractures. The dead included the 82-year old mathematician James Ireland Craig, who had devised the Craig retroazimuthal projection to enable Muslims to find the qibla, the direction to Mecca. Thousands of workers were displaced due to the destruction of these establishments.

== Aftermath ==
The events were seen at the time as evidence of the Egyptian government's inability to maintain order. Royal Egyptian Army troops quickly moved to restore order, which dissuaded the British from increasing the zone of their occupation. Prime Minister Mustafa el-Nahhas initially presented his resignation, which was refused by King Farouk I. The Wafdist government of el-Nahhas and the king blamed each other for the failure to call in troops earlier. The Council of Ministers imposed martial law throughout the country, and ordered the closure of schools and universities. El-Nahhas was appointed military commander-in-chief, and proclaimed a curfew in Cairo and Giza from 6 pm to 6 am. He also issued an order banning public gatherings of five or more persons, with offenders facing imprisonment.

The king was holding a banquet at Abdeen Palace for nearly 2,000 military officers when the disturbances took place. The banquet had been organized to celebrate the birth of his son Ahmad Fuad. The following day, the king dismissed the Wafdist government, a decision which slightly eased tensions with the British. However, the series of short-lived cabinets he appointed afterward failed to restore public confidence in the monarchy. The resultant political and domestic instability throughout the ensuing six months was among the factors that paved the way for the Egyptian Revolution of 1952. The Cairo Fire pushed the Free Officers to advance the date of their planned coup, which took place on 23 July 1952. The coup resulted in the forced abdication of Farouk I and the abolition of the monarchy a year later. It also reignited hostilities with the British, which led to the signing of the Anglo-Egyptian Evacuation Agreement of 1954. The last British troops stationed in Egypt left the country on 18 June 1956.

== Conspiracy theories ==
No one was arrested during the disorder. It appears that there were organized elements in the crowd, both left-wing and right-wing. According to official sources as well as eyewitnesses, the disturbances had been masterminded beforehand, and the groups responsible for it were highly skilled and trained. This was evidenced by the speed and precision with which the fires were ignited. The perpetrators held tools to force open closed doors, and used acetylene stoves to melt steel barriers placed on windows and doors. They executed their plan in record time through the use of nearly 30 cars. The timing was also another clear indication of the careful planning behind the arson. Saturday afternoon was chosen due to the weekend closure of offices and department stores, as well as the post-matinée closure of movie theaters.

Although some of the country's politicians may have been implicated in the initial outbreak of violence, it has never been fully determined who started the Cairo Fire. Historians still disagree about the identity of the initiators of the disturbances, leading to several conspiracy theories. Some believe King Farouk I masterminded the disorder to get rid of the government of el-Nahhas. Others have promoted the conspiracy theory that the British authorities instigated the fire to punish the administration of el-Nahhas for its unilateral abrogation of the Anglo-Egyptian Treaty in 1951. Alternative theories put the blame on the Muslim Brotherhood or the Egyptian Socialist Party, formerly known as Misr al-Fatat. Nevertheless, no material evidence has ever appeared to incriminate a specific group. Following the 23 July 1952 coup, an inquiry was opened to investigate the circumstances surrounding the Cairo Fire, but failed to identify the real perpetrators. The Cairo Fire thus remains an unsolved mystery.

== See also ==
- List of Black Saturdays
- List of riots

== Bibliography ==
- Goldschmidt, Arthur; Johnston, Robert (2004). Historical Dictionary of Egypt (3rd ed.). American University in Cairo Press. ISBN 978-977-424-875-7.
- Kerbœuf, Anne-Claire (2005). "The Cairo Fire of 26 January of 1952 and the Interpretations of History". In Goldschmidt, Arthur; Johnson, Amy J.; Salmoni, Barak A. (eds.). Re-Envisioning Egypt 1919–1952. American University in Cairo Press. pp. 194–216. ISBN 978-977-424-900-6.
- King, Joan Wucher (1989) [First published 1984]. Historical Dictionary of Egypt. Books of Lasting Value. American University in Cairo Press. ISBN 978-977-424-213-7.
