= Qibla compass =

Compass indicating the direction to Mecca for Muslim prayers

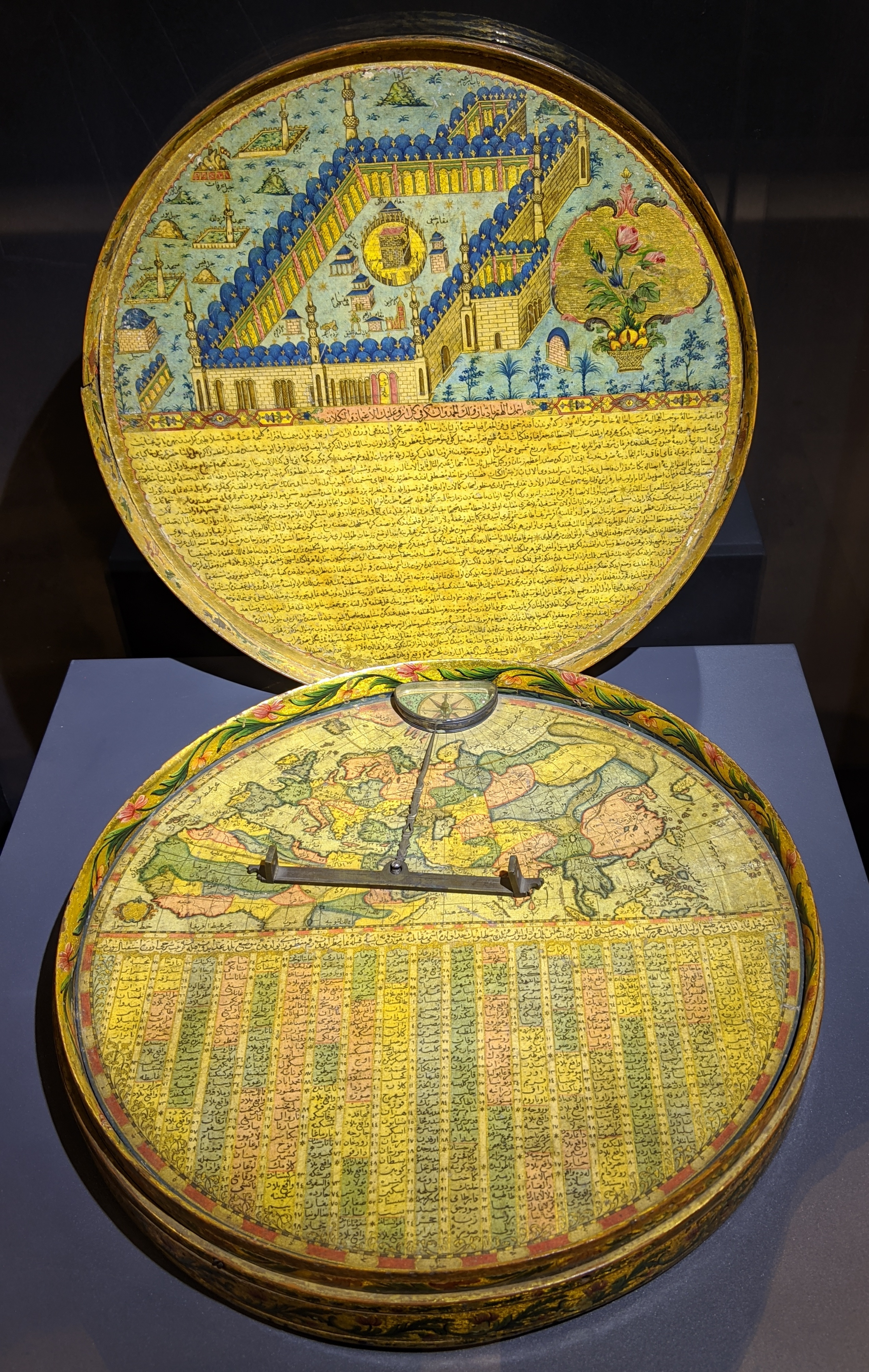
Qiblanuma incorporating a qibla compass. Istanbul, 1738

A qibla (qiblah) compass (sometimes also called qibla/qiblah indicator or qiblanuma) is a modified compass used by Muslims to indicate the direction to face to perform prayers. In Islam, this direction is called qibla, and points towards the city of Mecca and specifically to the Kaaba. While the compass, like any other compass, points north, the direction of prayer is indicated by marks on the perimeter of the dial, corresponding to different cities, or by a second pointer set by the user according to their own location. To determine the proper direction, one has to know with some precision both the longitude and latitude of one's own location and those of Mecca, the city toward which one must face. Once that is determined, the values are applied to a spherical triangle, and the angle from the local meridian to the required direction of Mecca can be determined.

The indicator usually consists of a round brass box with a hinged lid and an inset magnetic compass. A list of important Islamic places with their longitudes, latitudes, is inscribed in Arabic on all sides of the box. The compass has a blued steel needle with an open circle to indicate North. It is surmounted by a brass pyramidal pivot and a glass plate covers all. A brass ring over the rim of the compass carries a degree circle numbered in 'abjad' numerals and the cardinal points are marked. The folding triangular gnomon is supported by a decorative open-work motif. The lid of the box is secured by a hook fastener. The instrument serves the user to determine the correct 'qibla' - the direction to which Muslims turn in prayer to face the Ka'ba in Mecca. Ornate qibla compasses date back at least to the 18th century. Some recent versions use digital readout instead of a magnetic pointer. Some qibla compasses also include a tally counter, used to count the repetition of various du'a said after prayer.

== History ==
Al-Ashraf Umar II (d. 1296), sultan of the Sunni Rasulid Yemeni Caliphate, described the use of the compass as a qibla indicator in the 13th century. In a treatise about astrolabes and sundials, al-Ashraf includes several paragraphs on the construction of a compass bowl (ṭāsa). He then uses the compass to determine the north point, the meridian (khaṭṭ niṣf al-nahār), and qibla. This is the first mention of a compass in a medieval Islamic scientific text and its earliest known use as a qibla indicator, although al-Ashraf did not claim to be the first to use it for this purpose.

== See also ==
- Craig retroazimuthal projection
