= Loximuthal projection =

Pseudocylindrical compromise map projection

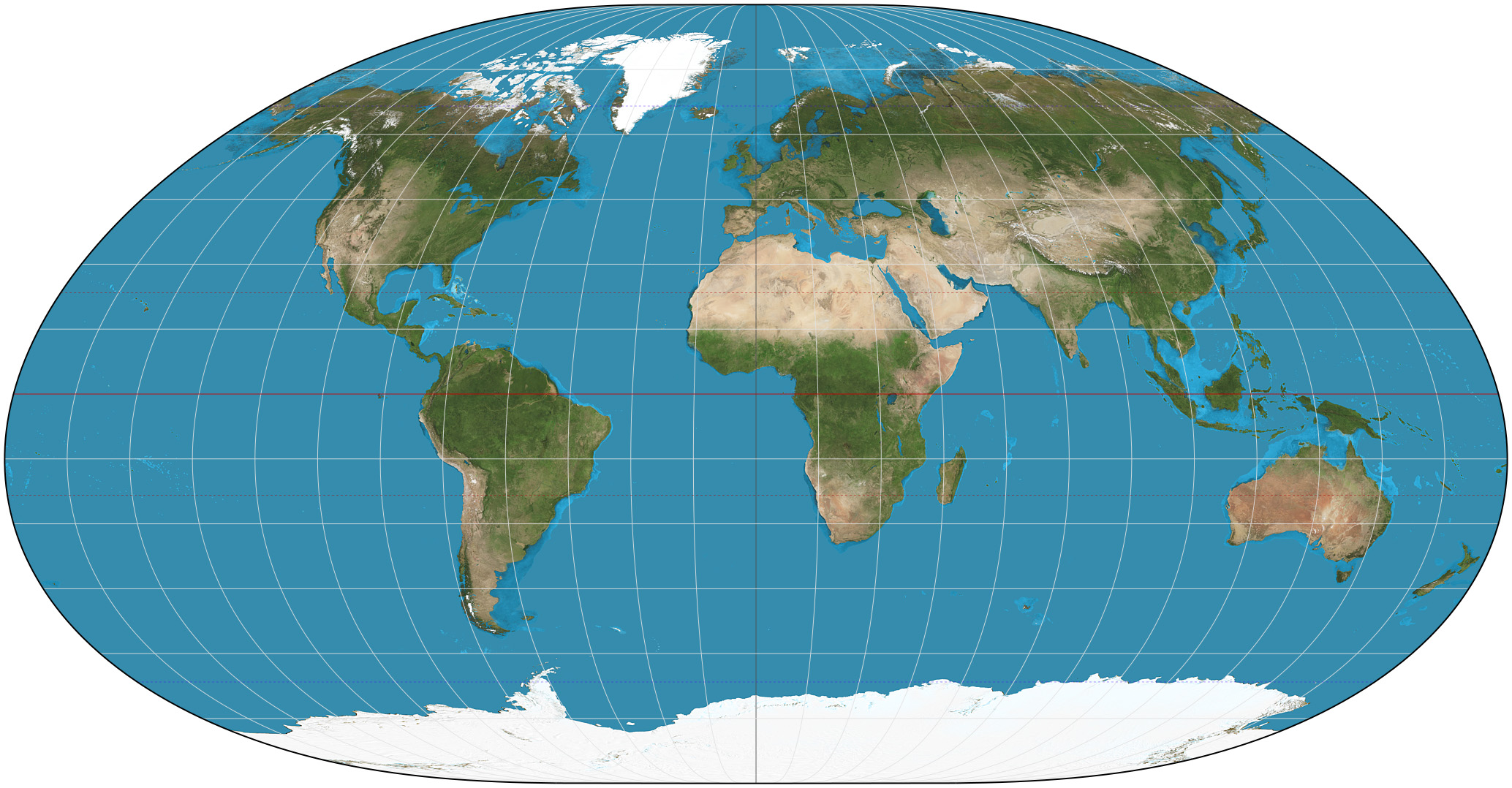
Loximuthal projection of the world, central point = 0°E, 30°N. 15° graticule

In cartography, the loximuthal projection is a map projection introduced by Karl Siemon in 1935, and independently in 1966 by Waldo R. Tobler, who named it. It is characterized by the fact that loxodromes (rhumb lines) from one chosen central point (the intersection of the central meridian and central latitude) are shown straight lines, correct in azimuth from the center, and are "true to scale" in the sense that distances measured along such lines are proportional to lengths of the corresponding rhumb lines on the surface of the Earth. It is neither an equal-area projection nor conformal.

== Description ==
A loxodrome on the surface of the Earth is a curve of constant bearing: it meets every parallel of latitude at the same angle. Suppose its bearing is θ north of east, so, for example, due east is θ = 0; due north is θ = a right angle; due west is θ = a half circle. The loxodrome's whole length as it goes from the south pole to the north pole is fairly routinely seen to be πR csc θ where R is the radius of the Earth (in particular if the loxodrome goes straight east, it circles the Earth infinitely many times without getting closer to either pole, so its length is ∞. Let a loxodrome pass through the point whose longitude and latitude are both 0; call this the "central point". Suppose one starts at the central point and travels a certain distance in a certain direction along this loxodrome and arrives at geographic location . Let f(p) be the point in the (x, y)-plane reached by going that same distance in that same direction from the origin (0, 0). Thus f(p) ∈ R × [−πR/2, πR/2]. That point f(p) is the image of p on the map. More than one loxodrome goes from the central point to p, but there is a unique shortest one: the one that does not cross the 180° meridian on its way from the central point to p. If one were to include loxodromes crossing the 180° meridian, one would get infinitely many images of the whole Earth, occupying the entire strip R × [−πR/2, πR/2]. Using only the unique shortest loxodrome from the central point to each point p gives only one copy, occupying a sort of oval.

== See also ==
- List of map projections
