= Qibla =

Direction that Muslims face while praying salah

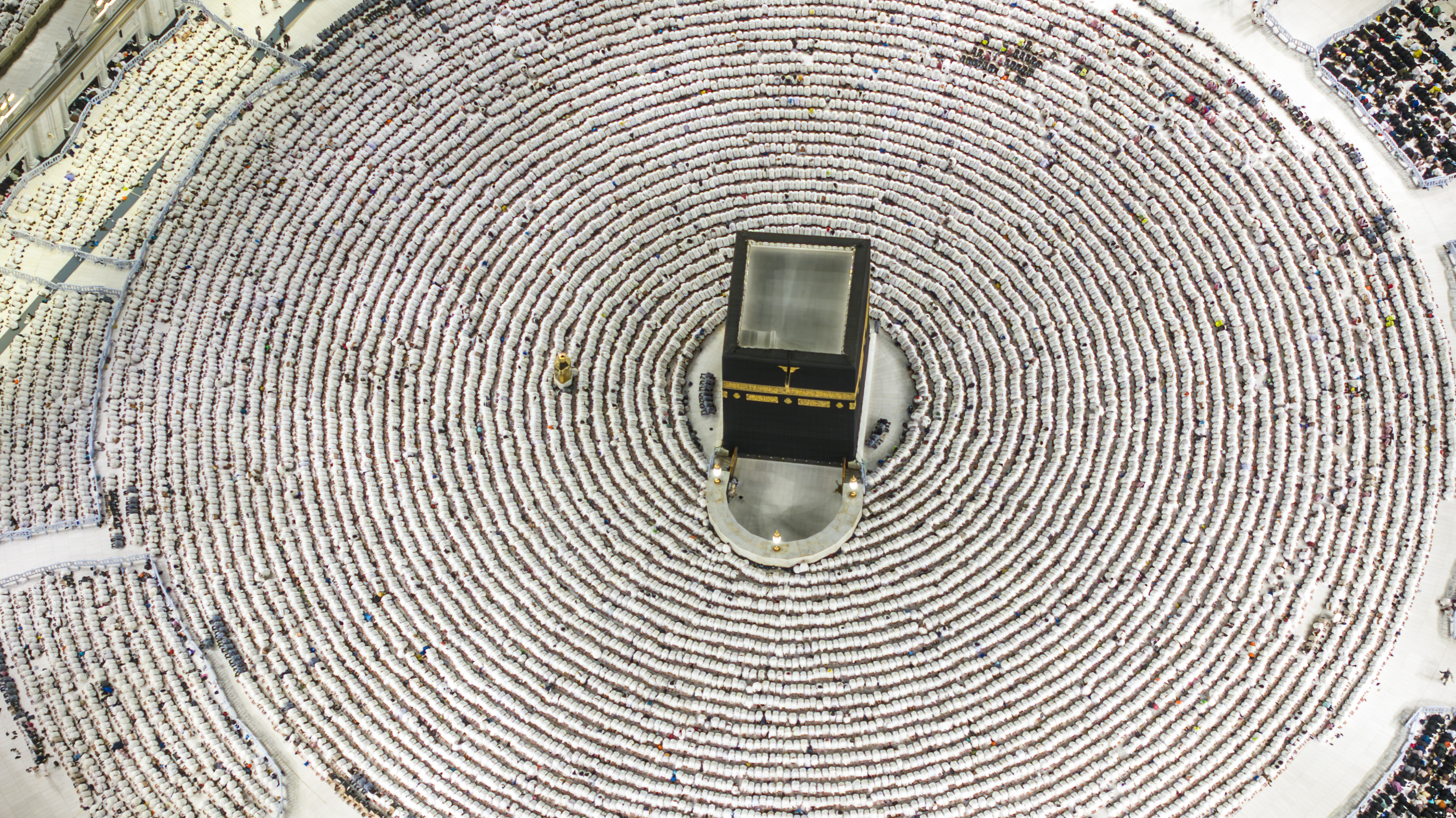
Muslims surrounding and facing the Kaaba for prayer

The qibla (Arabic: قبلة, lit. 'direction') is the direction towards the Kaaba in the Sacred Mosque in Mecca, which is used by Muslims in various religious contexts, particularly the direction of prayer for the salah. According to Islamic tradition, the Kaaba is believed to be a sacred site built by prophets Abraham and Ishmael, and that its use as the qibla was ordained by God in several verses of the Quran revealed to Muhammad in the second Hijri year. Prior to this revelation, Muhammad and his followers in Medina faced Jerusalem for prayers. Most mosques contain a mihrab (a wall niche) that indicates the direction of the qibla.

The qibla is also the direction for entering the ihram (sacred state for the hajj pilgrimage), the direction to which animals are turned during dhabihah (Islamic slaughter), the recommended direction to make du'a (supplications), the direction to avoid when relieving oneself or spitting, and the direction to which the deceased are aligned when buried. The qibla may be observed facing the Kaaba accurately (ayn al-ka'ba) or facing in the general direction (jihat al-ka'ba). Most Islamic scholars consider that jihat al-ka'ba is acceptable if the more precise ayn al-ka'ba cannot be ascertained.

The most common technical definition used by Muslim astronomers for a location is the direction on the great circle—in the Earth's Sphere—passing through the location and the Kaaba. This is the direction of the shortest possible path from a place to the Kaaba, and allows the exact calculation (hisab) of the qibla using a spherical trigonometric formula that takes the coordinates of a location and of the Kaaba as inputs (see formula below). The method is applied to develop mobile applications and websites for Muslims, and to compile qibla tables used in instruments such as the qibla compass. The qibla can also be determined at a location by observing the shadow of a vertical rod on the twice-yearly occasions when the Sun is directly overhead in Mecca—on 27 and 28 May at 12:18 Saudi Arabia Standard Time (09:18 UTC), and on 15 and 16 July at 12:27 SAST (09:27 UTC). The spaceflight of a devout Muslim, Sheikh Muszaphar Shukor, to the International Space Station (ISS) in 2007 generated a discussion with regard to the qibla direction from low Earth orbit, prompting the Islamic authority of his home country, Malaysia, to recommend determining the qibla "based on what is possible" for the astronaut.

== History and location ==
Muhammad and the early Muslims in Medina initially prayed towards Jerusalem in tradition, and changed the qibla to face the Kaaba in Mecca in 623 CE.

The qibla is the direction of the Kaaba, a cube-like building at the centre of the Sacred Mosque (al-Masjid al-Haram) in Mecca, in the Hijaz region of Saudi Arabia. Other than its role as qibla, it is also the holiest site for Muslims, also known as the House of God (Bayt Allah) and where the tawaf (the circumambulation ritual) is performed during the Hajj and umrah pilgrimages. The Kaaba has an approximately rectangular ground plan with its four corners pointing close to the four cardinal directions. According to the Quran, it was built by Abraham and Ishmael, both of whom are prophets in Islam. Few historical records remain detailing the history of the Kaaba before the rise of Islam, but in the generations prior to Muhammad, the Kaaba had been used as a shrine of the pre-Islamic Arabic religion.

There are different reports of the qibla direction when Muhammad was in Mecca (before his migration to Medina). According to a report cited by historian al-Tabari and exegete (textual interpreter) al-Baydawi, Muhammad prayed towards the Kaaba. Another report, cited by al-Baladhuri and also by al-Tabari, says that Muhammad prayed towards Jerusalem while in Mecca. Another report, mentioned in Ibn Hisham's biography of Muhammad, says that Muhammad prayed in such a way as to face the Kaaba and Jerusalem simultaneously. The qibla status of the Kaaba (or the Sacred Mosque in which it is located) is based on the verses 144, 149, and 150 of the al-Baqarah chapter of the Quran, each of which contains a command to "turn your face toward the Sacred Mosque" (fawalli wajhaka shatr al-Masjid il-Haram). According to Islamic traditions, these verses were revealed in the month of Rajab or Sha'ban in the second Hijri year (623 CE), or about 15 or 16 months after Muhammad's migration to Medina. Prior to these revelations, Muhammad and the Muslims in Medina had prayed towards Jerusalem as the qibla, the same direction as the prayer direction—the mizrah—used by the Jews of Medina. Islamic tradition says that these verses were revealed during a prayer congregation; Muhammad and his followers immediately changed their direction from Jerusalem to Mecca in the middle of the prayer ritual. The location of this event became the Masjid al-Qiblatayn ("The Mosque of the Two Qiblas").

Before the development of astronomy in the Islamic world, Muslims used traditional methods to determine the qibla. These methods included facing the direction that the companions of Muhammad had used when in the same place; using the setting and rising points of celestial objects; using the direction of the wind; or using due south, which was Muhammad's qibla in Medina. Early Islamic astronomy was built on its Indian and Greek counterparts, especially the works of Ptolemy, and soon Muslim astronomers developed methods to calculate the approximate directions of the qibla, starting from the mid-9th century. In the late 9th and 10th centuries, Muslim astronomers developed methods to find the exact direction of the qibla which are equivalent to the modern formula. Initially, this "qibla of the astronomers" was used alongside various traditionally determined qiblas, resulting in much diversity in medieval Muslim cities. In addition, the accurate geographic data necessary for the astronomical methods to yield an accurate result was not available before the 18th and 19th centuries, resulting in further diversity of the qibla. Historical mosques with differing qiblas still stand today throughout the Islamic world.

Today Muslims of all branches, including the Sunni and the Shia, all pray towards the Kaaba. Historically, one major exception was the Qarmatians, a now-defunct syncretic Shia sect which rejected the Kaaba as the qibla; in 930, they sacked Mecca and for a time took the Kaaba's Black Stone to their centre of power in al-Ahsa, with the intention of starting a new era in Islam.

== Religious significance ==
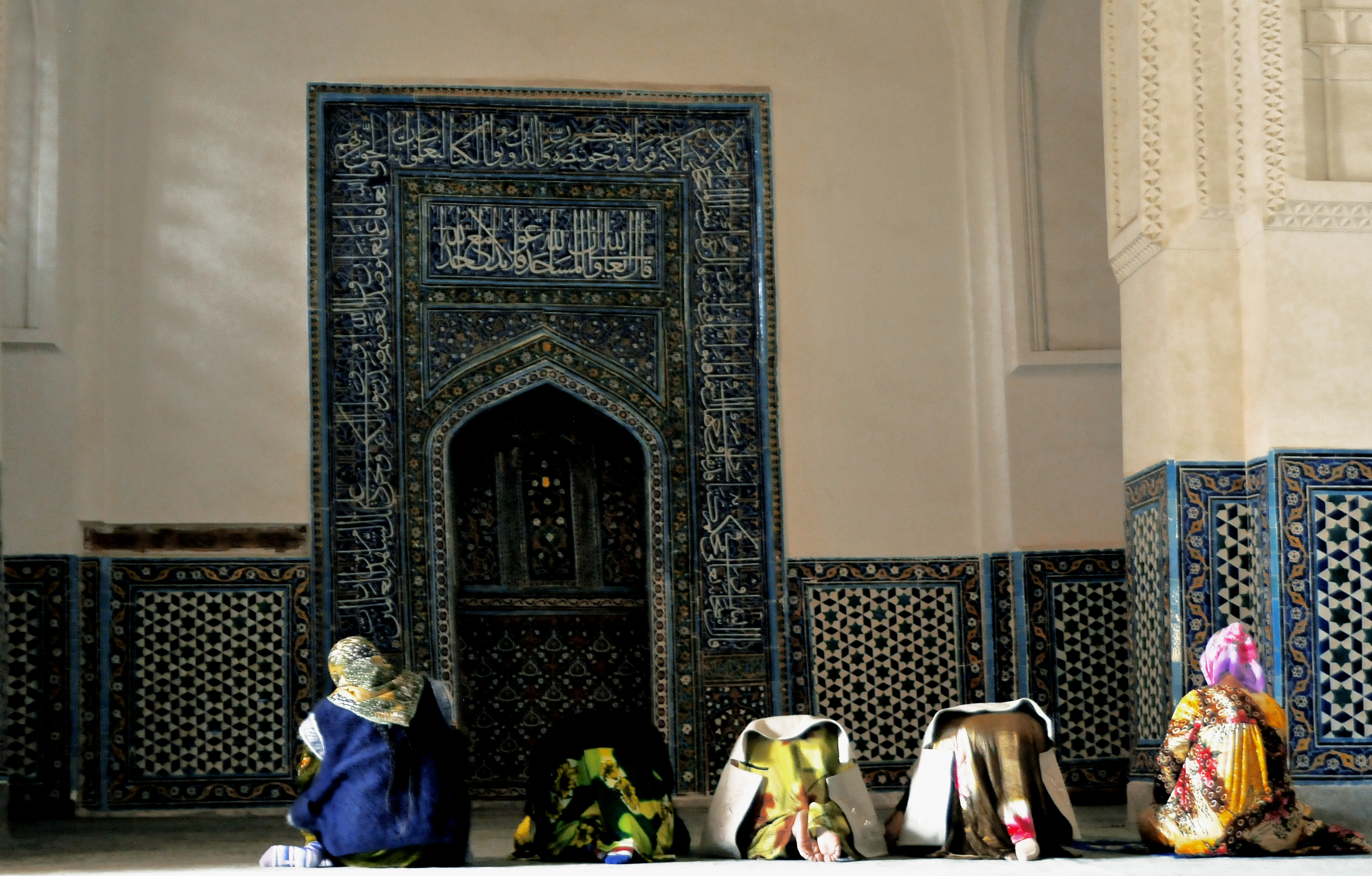
The Mihrab in one of the walls of a mosque indicates the qibla direction to be used for prayers. Picture from the Shah-i-Zinda, Samarkand, Uzbekistan.

Etymologically, the Arabic word qibla (قبلة) means "direction". In Islamic ritual and law, it refers to a special direction faced by Muslims during prayers and other religious contexts. Islamic religious scholars agree that facing the qibla is a necessary condition for the validity of salah—the Islamic ritual prayer—in normal conditions; exceptions include prayers during a state of fear or war, as well as non-obligatory prayers during travel. The hadith (Muhammad's tradition) also prescribes that Muslims face the qibla when entering the ihram (sacred state for hajj), after the middle jamrah (stone-throwing ritual) during the pilgrimage. Islamic etiquette (adab) calls for Muslims to turn the head of an animal when it is slaughtered, and the faces of the dead when they are buried, toward the qibla. The qibla is the preferred direction when making a supplication and is to be avoided when defecating, urinating, and spitting.

Inside a mosque, the qibla is usually indicated by a mihrab, a niche in its qibla-facing wall. In a congregational prayer, the imam stands in it or close to it, in front of the rest of the congregation. The mihrab became a part of the mosque during the Umayyad period and its form was standardised during the Abbasid period; before that, the qibla of a mosque was known from the orientation of one of its walls, called the qibla wall. The term mihrab itself is attested only once in the Quran, but it refers to a place of prayer of the Israelites rather than a part of a mosque. (Note: This reference occurs in Quran 19:11) The Amr ibn al-As Mosque in Fustat, Egypt, one of the oldest mosques, is known to have been built originally without a mihrab, though one has since been added.

=== Ayn al-ka'ba and jihat al-ka'ba ===
Ayn al-ka'ba ("standing so as to face the Kaaba head-on") is a position facing the qibla so that an imaginary line extending from the person's line of sight would pass through the Kaaba. This manner of observing the qibla is easily done inside the Great Mosque of Mecca and its surroundings, but given that the Kaaba is less than 20 metres (66 ft) wide, this is virtually impossible from distant locations. For example, from Medina, with a 338-kilometre (210 mi) straight-line distance from the Kaaba, a one-degree deviation from the precise imaginary line—an error hardly noticeable when setting one's prayer mat or assuming one's posture—results in a 5.9-kilometre (3.7 mi) shift from the site of the Kaaba. This effect is amplified when further than Mecca: from Jakarta, Indonesia—some 7,900 km (4,900 mi) away, a one-degree deviation causes more than a 100-kilometre (62 mi) shift, and even an arc second's deviation—(1/3600 of a degree)—causes a more than 100-metre (330 ft) shift from the location of the Kaaba. In comparison, the construction process of a mosque can easily introduce an error of up to five degrees from the calculated qibla, and the installation of prayer rugs inside the mosque as indicators for worshippers can add another deviation of five degrees from the mosque's orientation.

A minority of Islamic religious scholars—for example Ibn Arabi (d. 1240)—consider ayn al-ka'ba to be obligatory during the ritual prayer, while others consider it obligatory only when one is able. For locations further than Mecca, scholars such as Abu Hanifa (d. 699) and Al-Qurtubi (d. 1214) argue that it is permissible to assume jihat al-ka'ba, facing only the general direction of the Kaaba. Others argue that the ritual condition of facing the qibla is already fulfilled when the imaginary line to the Kaaba is within one's field of vision. For instance, there are legal opinions that accept the entire southeastern quadrant in Al-Andalus (Islamic Iberian Peninsula), and the southwestern quadrant in Central Asia, to be valid qibla. Arguments for the validity of jihat al-ka'ba include the wording of the Quran, which commands Muslims only to "turn [one's] face" toward the Great Mosque, and to avoid imposing requirements that would be impossible to fulfill if ayn al-ka'ba were to be obligatory in all places. The Shafi'i school of Islamic law, as codified in Abu Ishaq al-Shirazi's 11th-century Kitab al-Tanbih fi'l-Fiqh, argues that one must follow the qibla indicated by the local mosque when one is not near Mecca or, when not near a mosque, to ask a trustworthy person. When this is not possible, one is to make one's own determination—to exercise ijtihad—by the means at one's disposal.

== Determination ==
=== Theoretical basis: the great circle ===
The great circle passing through two points (A and B) indicates the shortest path (bold) between them.

A great circle, also called the orthodrome, is any circle on a sphere whose centre is identical to the centre of the sphere. For example, all lines of longitude are great circles of the Earth, while the equator is the only line of latitude that is also a great circle (other lines of latitude are centered north or south of the centre of the Earth). The great circle is the theoretical basis in most models that seek to mathematically determine the direction of the qibla from a locality. In such models, the qibla is defined as the direction of the great circle passing through the locality and the Kaaba. One of the properties of a great circle is that it indicates the shortest path connecting any pair of points along the circle—this is the basis of its use to determine the qibla. The great circle is similarly used to find the shortest flight path connecting the two locations—therefore the qibla calculated using the great circle method is generally close to the direction of the locality to Mecca. As the ellipsoid is a more accurate figure of the Earth than a perfect sphere, modern researchers have looked into using ellipsoidal models to calculate the qibla, replacing the great circle by the geodesics on an ellipsoid. This results in more complicated calculations, while the improvement in accuracy falls well within the typical precision of the setting out of a mosque or the placement of a mat. For example, calculations using the GRS 80 ellipsoidal model yields the qibla of 18°47′06″ for a location in San Francisco, while the great circle method yields 18°51′05″.

=== Calculations with spherical trigonometry ===
The great circle model is applied to calculate the qibla using spherical trigonometry—a branch of geometry that deals with the mathematical relations between the sides and angles of triangles formed by three great circles of a sphere (as opposed to the conventional trigonometry which deals with those of a two-dimensional triangle).

For example, the qibla from the city of Yogyakarta, Indonesia, can be calculated as follows. The city's coordinates, $\phi$, are 7.801389°S, 110.364444°E, while the Kaaba's coordinates, $\phi_Q$, are 21.422478°N, 39.825183°E. The longitude difference $\Delta L$ is (110.364444 minus 39.825183) 70.539261. Substituting the values into the (3) obtains an answer of approximately 295°, or 25° north of west.

If a location $O$, the Kaaba $Q$, and the north pole $N$ form a triangle on the sphere of the Earth, then the qibla is indicated by $OQ$, which is the direction of the great circle passing through both $O$ and $Q$. The qibla can also be expressed as an angle, $\angle NOQ$ (or $\angle q$), of the qibla with respect to the north, also called the inhiraf al-qibla. This angle can be calculated as a mathematical function of the local latitude $\phi$, the latitude of the Kaaba $\phi_Q$, and the longitude difference between the locality and the Kaaba $\Delta L$. This function is derived from the cotangent rule which applies to any spherical triangle with angles $A$, $B$, $C$ and sides $a$, $b$, $c$:

$\cos a\,\cos C=\cot b\,\sin a - \cot B \,\sin C$	1

Applying this formula in the spherical triangle $\triangle NOQ$ (substituting $B = \angle q = \angle NOQ$) and applying trigonometric identities obtain:

$\tan q = \frac{\sin \phi \cos \Delta L - \cos \phi \tan \phi_Q}{\sin \Delta L}$, or	2

$q = \arctan \left( \frac{\sin \phi \cos \Delta L - \cos \phi \tan \phi_Q}{\sin \Delta L}\right)$	3

This formula was derived by modern scholars, but equivalent methods have been known to Muslim astronomers since the 9th century (3rd century AH), developed by various scholars, including Habash al-Hasib (active in Damascus and Baghdad c. 850), Al-Nayrizi (Baghdad, c. 900), Ibn Yunus (10th–11th century), Ibn al-Haytham (11th century), and Al-Biruni (11th century). Today spherical trigonometry also underlies nearly all applications or websites which calculate the qibla.

When the qibla angle with respect to the north, $\angle q$, is known, true north needs to be known to find the qibla in practice. Common practical methods to find it include the observation of the shadow at the culmination of the sun—when the sun crosses exactly the local meridian. At this point, any vertical object would cast a shadow oriented in the north–south direction. The result of this observation is very accurate, but it requires an accurate determination of the local time of culmination as well as making the correct observation at that exact moment. Another common method is using the compass, which is more practical because it can be done at any time; the disadvantage is that the north indicated by a magnetic compass differs from true north. This magnetic declination can measure up to 20°, which can vary in different places on Earth and changes over time.

=== Shadow observation ===
Twice a year, the Sun passes directly above the Kaaba, allowing the observation of its direction from the shadow of a vertical object.

As observed from Earth, the Sun appears to "shift" between the Northern and Southern Tropics seasonally; additionally, it appears to move from east to west daily as a consequence of the Earth's rotation. The combination of these two apparent motions means that every day the Sun crosses the meridian once, usually not precisely overhead but to the north or to the south of the observer. In locations between the two tropics—latitudes lower than 23.5° north or south—at certain moments of the year (usually twice a year) the Sun passes almost directly overhead. This happens when the Sun crosses the meridian while being at the local latitude at the same time.

The city of Mecca is among the places where this occurs, due to its location at 21°25′ N. It occurs twice a year, firstly on 27/28 May at about 12:18 Saudi Arabia Standard Time (SAST) or 09:18 UTC, and secondly on 15/16 July at 12:27 SAST (09:27 UTC). (Note: The dates slightly vary from year-to-year because the calendar year is not synchronized with the astronomical year (see leap year).) As the sun reaches the zenith of the Kaaba, any vertical object on earth that receives sunlight cast a shadow that indicates the qibla (see picture). This method of finding the qibla is called rasd al-qiblat ("observing the qibla"). Since night falls on the hemisphere opposite of the Kaaba, half the locations on Earth (including Australia as well as most of the Americas and the Pacific Ocean) cannot observe this directly. Instead, such places observe the opposite phenomenon when the Sun passes above the antipodal point of the Kaaba (in other words, the Sun passes directly underneath the Kaaba), causing shadows in the opposite direction from those observed during rasd al-qiblat. This occurs twice a year, on 14 January 00:30 SAST (21:30 UTC the previous day) and 29 November 00:09 SAST (21:09 UTC the previous day). Observations made within five minutes of the rasd al-qiblat moments or its antipodal counterparts, or at the same time of the day two days before or after each event, still show accurate directions with negligible difference.

=== On the world map ===
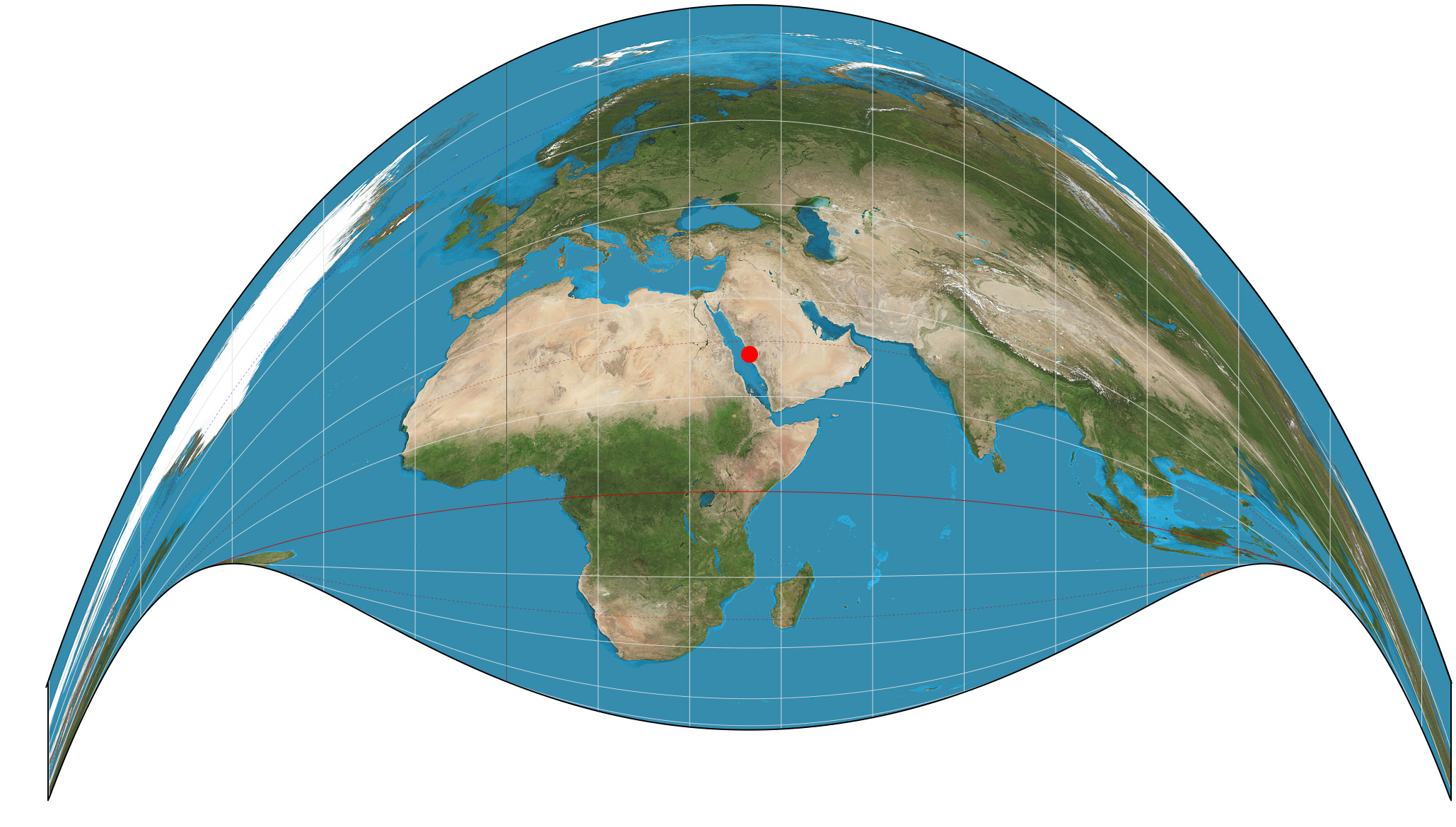
A map generated using the Craig retroazimuthal projection centered on Mecca. Unlike most map projections, it preserves the direction from any other point on the map to the centre.

Spherical trigonometry provides the shortest path from any point on Earth to the Kaaba, even though the indicated direction might seem counterintuitive when imagined on a flat world map. For example, the qibla from Alaska obtained through spherical trigonometry is almost due north. This apparent counter-intuitiveness is caused by projections used by world maps, which by necessity distort the surface of the Earth. A straight line shown by the world map in using the Mercator projection is called the rhumb line or the loxodrome, which is used to indicate the qibla by a minority of Muslims. (Note: For an example of the loxodrome used to find qibla, see #North America.) It can result in a dramatic difference in some places; for example, in some parts of North America the flat map shows Mecca in the southeast while the great circle calculation shows it to the northeast. In Japan the map shows it to the southwest, while the great circle shows it to the northwest. The majority of Muslims, however, follow the great circle method.

A retroazimuthal projection is any map projection which preserves the angular direction (the azimuth) of the great circle path from any point of the map to a point selected as the centre of the map. The initial purpose of its development was to help finding the qibla, by choosing the Kaaba as the centre point. The earliest surviving works using this projection were two astrolabe-shaped brass instruments created in 18th-century Iran. They contain grids covering locations between Spain and China, label the locations of major cities along with their names, but do not show any coastline. The first of the two was discovered in 1989; its diameter is 22.5 centimetres (8.9 in) and it has a ruler with which one can read the direction of Mecca from the markings on the instrument's circumference, and the distance to Mecca from the markings on the ruler. (Note: King 1996, p. 150 has a picture of one of the instruments) Only the second one is signed by its creator, Muhammad Husayn. The first formal design of a retroazimuthal projection in the Western literature is the Craig projection or the Mecca projection, created by the Scottish mathematician James Ireland Craig, who worked at the Survey Department of Egypt, in 1910. His map is centered in Mecca and its range is limited to show the predominantly Muslim lands. Extending the map further than 90° in longitude from the centre will result in crowding and overlaps.

=== Traditional methods ===
Historical records and surviving old mosques show that throughout history the qibla was often determined by simple methods based on tradition or "folk science" not based on mathematical astronomy. Some early Muslims used due south everywhere as the qibla, literally following Muhammad's instruction to face south while he was in Medina (Mecca is due south of Medina). Some mosques as far away as al-Andalus to the west and Central Asia to the east face south, even though Mecca is nowhere near that direction. In various places, there are also the "qiblas of the companions" (qiblat al-sahaba), those which were used there by the Companions of the Prophet—the first generation of Muslims, who are considered role models in Islam. Such directions continued to be used by some Muslims in the following centuries, side by side with other directions, even after Muslim astronomers began to use calculations to determine more accurate directions to Mecca. Among the directions described as the qiblas of the companions, are due south in Syria and Palestine, the direction of the winter sunrise in Egypt, and the direction of the winter sunset in Iraq. The direction of the winter sunrise and sunset are also traditionally favoured because they are parallel to the walls of the Kaaba.

== Development of methods ==
=== Pre-astronomy ===
The determination of qibla has been an important problem for Muslim communities throughout history. Muslims are required to know the qibla to perform their daily prayers, and it is also needed to determine the orientation of mosques. When Muhammad lived among the Muslims in Medina (which, like Mecca, is also in the Hejaz region), he prayed due south, according to the known direction of Mecca. Within the few generations following Muhammad's death in 632, Muslims had reached places far away from Mecca, presenting the new challenge of determining the qibla in locations far removed from those in which the earlier methods were employed. Mathematical methods based on astronomy would be developed only around the end of the 8th century, and were not initially popular. Therefore, early Muslims relied on non-astronomical methods.

There was a wide range of traditional methods in determining the qibla during this early Islamic period, resulting in different directions used even in the same place. In addition to due south and the qiblas of the companions, the Arabs also knew a form of "folk" astronomy—called so by the historian of astronomy David A. King to distinguish it from the more precise mathematical astronomy—originating from pre-Islamic traditions. It used natural phenomena, including the observation of the Sun, the Moon, the stars, and wind, without any basis in mathematics. These methods yield specific directions in individual localities, often using the fixed setting and rising points of a specific star, the sunrise or sunset at the equinoxes, or at the summer or the winter solstices. Historical sources record several such qiblas, for example: sunrise at the equinoxes (due east) in the Maghreb, sunset at the equinoxes (due west) in India, the origin of the north wind or the fixed location of the North Star in Yemen, the rising point of the star Suhayl (Canopus) in Syria, and the midwinter sunset in Iraq. Such directions appear in texts of fiqh (Islamic jurisprudence) and texts of folk astronomy. Astronomers (aside from folk astronomers) typically do not comment on these methods, but they were not opposed by Islamic legal scholars. The traditional directions were still in use when methods were developed to calculate the qibla more accurately, and they still appear in some surviving medieval mosques today.

=== With astronomy ===
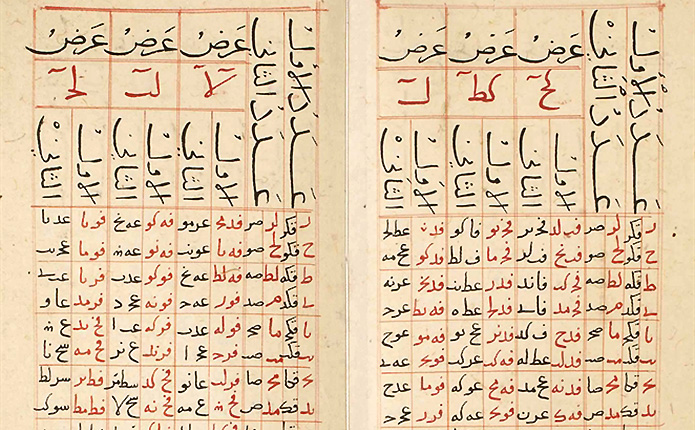
A portion of the qibla table compiled by astronomer and muwaqqit Shams al-Din al-Khalili of Damascus in the 14th century. The qibla directions are listed in the Arabic sexagesimal notation.

The study of astronomy—known as ilm al-falak ("science of the celestial orbs") in the Islamic intellectual tradition—began to appear in the Islamic World in the second half of the 8th century, centred in Baghdad, the principal city of the Abbasid Caliphate. Initially, the science was introduced through the works of Indian authors, but after the 9th century the works of Greek astronomers such as Ptolemy were translated into Arabic and became the main references in the field. Muslim astronomers preferred Greek astronomy because they considered it to be better supported by theoretical explanations and therefore it could be developed as an exact science; however, the influence of Indian astronomy survives especially in the compilation of astronomical tables. This new science was applied to develop new methods of determining the qibla, making use of the concept of latitude and longitude taken from Ptolemy's Geography as well as trigonometric formulae developed by Muslim scholars. Most textbooks of astronomy written in the medieval Islamic World contain a chapter on the determination of the qibla, considered one of the many things connecting astronomy with Islamic law (sharia). According to David A. King, various medieval solutions for the determination of the qibla "bear witness to the development of mathematical methods from the 3rd/9th to the 8th/14th centuries and to the level of sophistication in trigonometry and computational techniques attained by these scholars".

The first mathematical methods developed in the early 9th century were approximate solutions to the mathematical problem, usually using a flat map or two-dimensional geometry. Since in reality the Earth is spherical, the directions found were inexact, but they were sufficient for locations relatively close to Mecca (including as far away as Egypt and Iran) because the errors were less than 2°.

Exact solutions, based on three-dimensional geometry and spherical trigonometry, began to appear in the mid-9th century. Habash al-Hasib wrote an early example, using an orthographic projection. (Note: The details of this method and its proof are provided in King 1996, pp. 144–145) Another group of solutions uses trigonometric formulas, for example Al-Nayrizi's four-step application of Menelaus's theorem. (Note: The details of this method and its proof are provided in King 1996, pp. 145–146) Subsequent scholars, including Ibn Yunus, Abu al-Wafa, Ibn al-Haitham and Al-Biruni, proposed other methods which are confirmed to be accurate from the viewpoint of modern astronomy.

Muslim astronomers subsequently used these methods to compile tables showing the qibla from a list of locations, grouped by their latitude and longitude differences from Mecca. The oldest known example, from c. 9th-century Baghdad, contained entries for each degree and arc minute up to 20°. In the 14th century, Shams al-Din al-Khalili, an astronomer who served as a muwaqqit (timekeeper) in the Umayyad Mosque of Damascus, compiled a qibla table for 2,880 coordinates with longitude differences of up to 60° from Mecca, and with latitudes ranging from 10° to 50°. King opines that among the medieval qibla tables, al-Khalili's work is "the most impressive from the view of its scope and its accuracy".

The accuracy of applying these methods to actual locations depend on the accuracy of its input parameters—the local latitude and the latitude of Mecca, and the longitude difference. At the time of the development of these methods, the latitude of a location could be determined to several arc minutes' accuracy, but there was no accurate method to determine a location's longitude. Common methods used to estimate the longitude difference included comparing the local timing of a lunar eclipse versus the timing in Mecca, or measuring the distance of caravan routes; the Central Asian scholar Al-Biruni made his estimate by averaging various approximate methods. Because of longitudinal inaccuracy, medieval qibla calculations (including those using mathematically accurate methods) differ from the modern values. For example, while the Al-Azhar Mosque in Cairo was built using the "qibla of the astronomers", but the mosque's qibla (127°) differs somewhat from the results of modern calculations (135°) because the longitude difference used was off by three degrees.

Accurate longitude values in the Islamic world were available only after the application of cartographic surveys in the 18th and 19th centuries. Modern coordinates, along with new technologies such as GPS satellites and electronic instruments, resulted in the development of practical instruments to calculate the qibla. The qibla found using modern instruments might differ from the direction of mosques, because a mosque might be built before the advent of modern data, and orientation inaccuracies might have been introduced during the building process of modern mosques. When this is known, sometimes the direction of the mosque's mihrab is still observed, and sometimes a marker is added (such as lines drawn in the mosque) that can be followed instead of the mihrab.

== Instruments ==
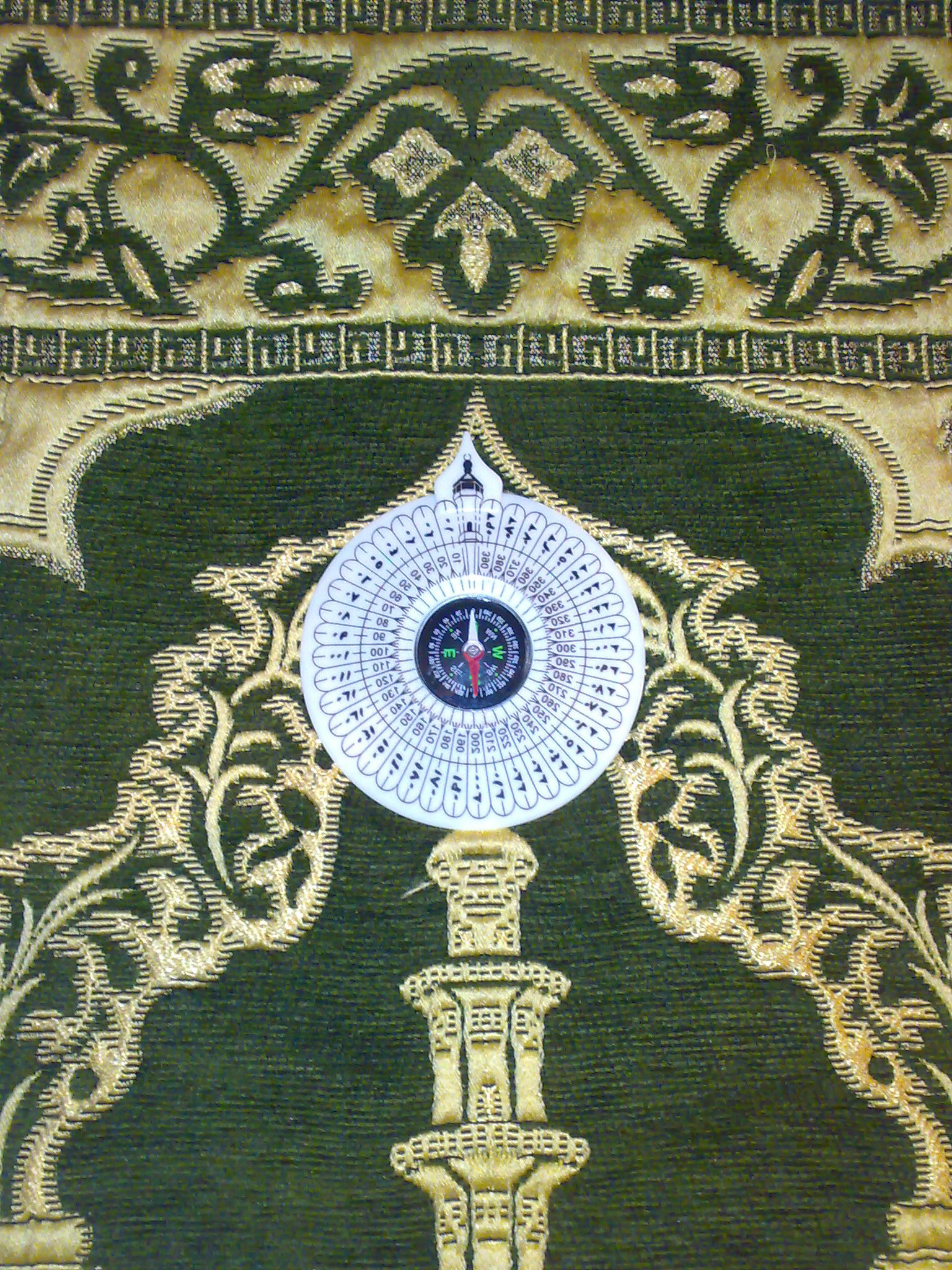
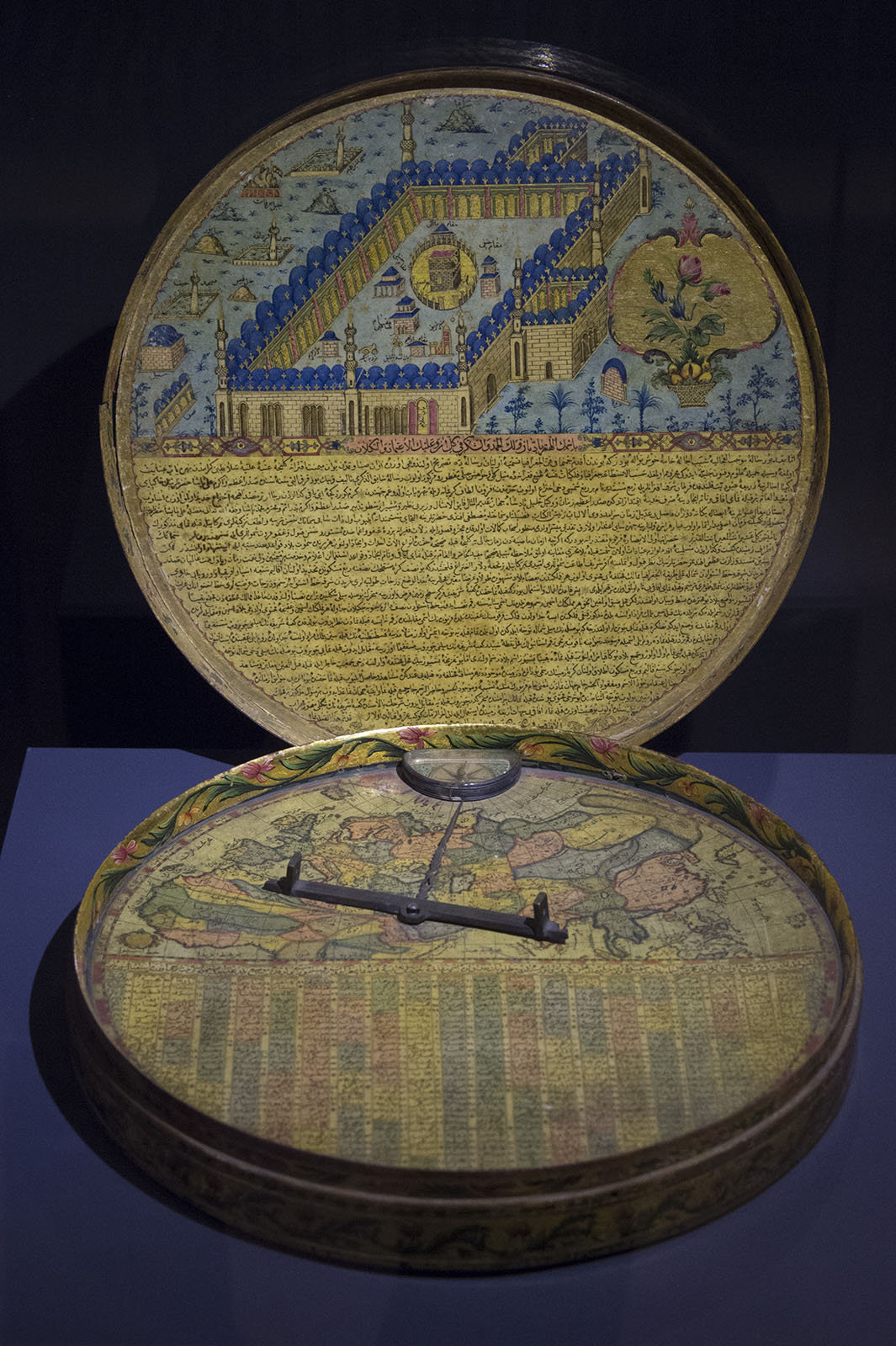
A prayer mat with a modern qibla compass (left); an Ottoman-era qibla compass dated 1738 (right)

Muslims use various instruments to find the qibla direction when not near a mosque. The qibla compass is a magnetic compass which includes a table or a list of qibla angles from major settlements. Some electronic versions use satellite coordinates to calculate and indicate the qibla automatically. Qibla compasses have existed since around 1300, supplemented by the list of qibla angles often written on the instruments themselves. Hotel rooms with Muslim guests may use a sticker showing the qibla on the ceiling or a drawer. With the advent of computing, various mobile apps and websites use formulae to calculate the qibla for their users.

== Diversity ==
=== Early Islamic world ===
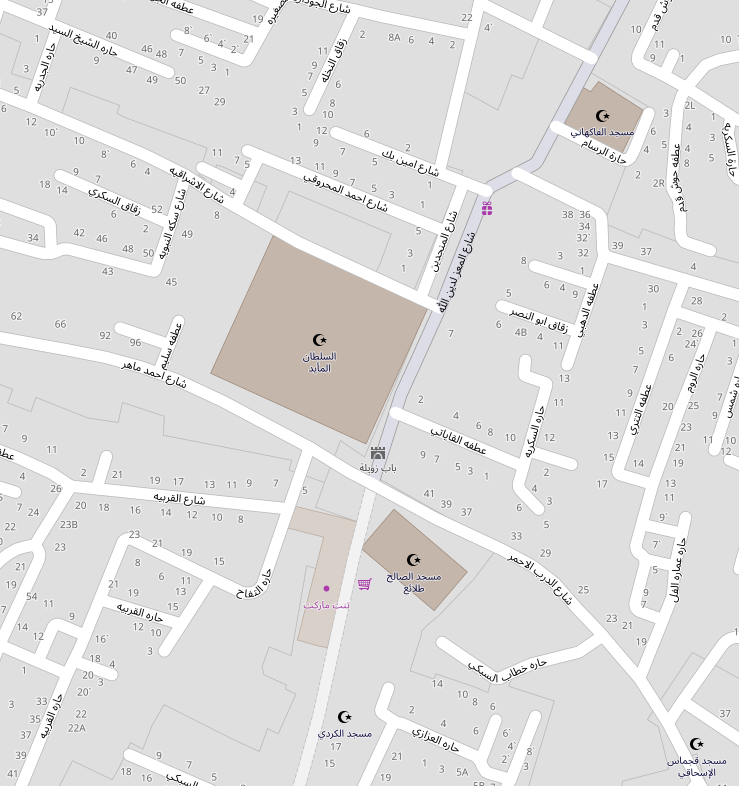
A map of an area in modern Cairo. The mosques have slightly different orientations.

Because varying methods have been used to determine the qibla, mosques were built throughout history in different directions, including some that still stand today. Methods based on astronomy and mathematics were not always used, and the same determination method could yield different qiblas due to differences in the accuracy of data and calculations. Egyptian historian Al-Maqrizi (d. 1442) recorded various qibla angles used in Cairo at the time: 90° (due east), 117° (winter sunrise, the "qibla of the sahaba"), 127° (calculated by astronomers, such as Ibn Yunus), 141° (Mosque of Ibn Tulun), 156° (the rising point of Suhayl/Canopus), 180° (due south, emulating the qibla of Muhammad in Medina), and 204° (the setting point of Canopus). The modern qibla for Cairo is 135°, which was not known at the time. This diversity also results in the non-uniform layout in Cairo's districts, because the streets are often oriented according to the varying orientation of the mosques. Historical records also indicate the diversity of qiblas in other major cities, including Córdoba (113°, 120°, 135°, 150°, and 180° were recorded in the 12th century) and Samarkand (180°, 225°, 230°, 240°, and 270° were recorded in the 11th century). According to the doctrine of jihat al-ka'ba, the diverse directions of qiblas are still valid as long as they are still in the same broad direction.

In 1990, the scholar of geography Michael E. Bonine conducted a survey of the main mosques of all major cities in present-day Morocco—constructed from the Idrisid period (8th–10th centuries) up to the Alawi period (17th century to present). While modern calculations yield the qiblas of between 91° (almost due east) in Marrakesh and 97° in Tangier, only mosques constructed in the Alaouite period are constructed with qiblas relatively close to this range. The qibla of older mosques vary considerably, with concentrations occurring between 155°–160° (slightly east of south) as well as 120°–130° (almost southeast). In 2008, Bonine also published a survey of the main city mosques of Tunisia, in which he found that most were aligned close to 147°. This is the direction of the Great Mosque of Kairouan, originally built in 670 and last rebuilt by the Aghlabids in 862, which is often credited as the model used by the other mosques. Among the mosques surveyed, the Great Mosque of Sousse was the only one with a significant difference, facing further south at 163°. The actual direction to Mecca as calculated using the great circle method ranges from 110° to 113° throughout the country.

=== Indonesia ===
Variations of the qibla also occur in Indonesia, the country with the world's largest Muslim population. The astronomically calculated qibla ranges from 291°—295° (21°—25° north of west) depending on the exact location in the archipelago. However, the qibla is often known traditionally simply as "the west", resulting in mosques built oriented due west or to the direction of sunset—which varies slightly throughout the year. Different opinions exist among Indonesian Islamic astronomers: Tono Saksono et al. argues in 2018 that facing the qibla during prayers is more of a "spiritual prerequisite" than a precise physical one, and that an exact direction to the Kaaba itself from thousands of kilometres away requires an extreme precision impossible to achieve when building a mosque or when standing for prayers. On the other hand, Muhammad Hadi Bashori in 2014 opines that "correcting the qibla is indeed a very urgent thing", and can be guided by simple methods such as observing the shadow.

In the history of the region, disputes about the qibla had also occurred in the then-Dutch East Indies in the 1890s. When the Indonesian scholar and future founder of Muhammadiyah, Ahmad Dahlan, returned from his Islamic and astronomy studies in Mecca, he found that mosques in the royal capital of Yogyakarta had inaccurate qiblas, including the Kauman Great Mosque, which faced due west. His efforts in adjusting the qibla were opposed by the traditional ulama of the Yogyakarta Sultanate, and a new mosque built by Dahlan using his calculations was demolished by a mob. Dahlan rebuilt his mosque in the 1900s, and later the Kauman Great Mosque would also be reoriented using the astronomically calculated qibla.

=== North America ===
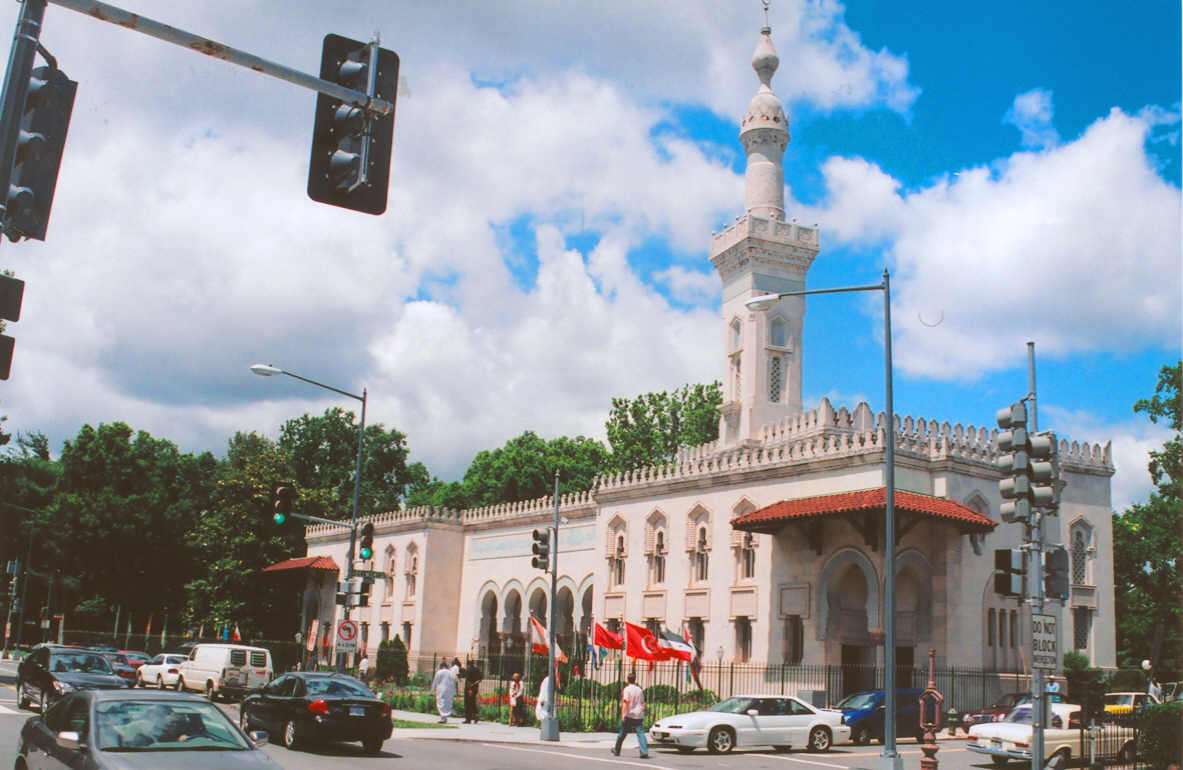
The Islamic Center of Washington (founded 1953), one of the early mosques in the United States. Its qibla faces the northeast in line with astronomical calculations.

For locations outside of historic Muslim communities, determination of the qibla can be a matter of debate. The Islamic Center of Washington, D.C. was built in 1953 facing slightly north of east and initially puzzled some observers, including Muslims, because Washington, D.C.'s latitude is 17°30′ north of Mecca. Even though a line drawn on world maps—such as those using the Mercator projection—would suggest a southeastern direction to Mecca, the astronomical calculation using the great circle method does yield a north-of-east direction (56°33′). Nevertheless, most early mosques in the United States face east or southeast, following the apparent direction on world maps. In 1978, an American Muslim scientist, S. Kamal Abdali, wrote a book arguing that the correct qibla from North America was north or northeast as calculated by the great circle method which identifies the shortest path to Mecca. (Note: This book is Abdali, S. Kamal (1978). Prayers schedule for North America. Indianapolis: American Trust Publications. OCLC 27738892.) This conclusion was widely circulated and then accepted by the Muslim community, and mosques were subsequently reoriented as a result. In 1993, two religious scholars, Riad Nachef and Samir Kadi, published a book arguing for a southeastern qibla, writing that the north/northeast qibla was invalid and resulted from a lack of religious knowledge. (Note: This book is Nachef, Riad; Kadi, Samir (1993). The Substantiation of the People of Truth that the Direction of al-Qibla in the United States and Canada is to the Southeast. Philadelphia: Association of Islamic Charitable Projects.) In reaction, Abdali published a response to their arguments and criticism in an article entitled "The Correct Qibla" online in 1997. (Note: This article is Abdali, S. Kamal (17 September 1997). "The Correct Qibla" (PDF). geomete.com. Archived (PDF) from the original on 18 December 2019.) The two opinions resulted in a period of debate about the correct qibla. Eventually most North American Muslims accepted the north/northeast qibla with a minority following the east/southeast qibla.

=== Space and ISS ===
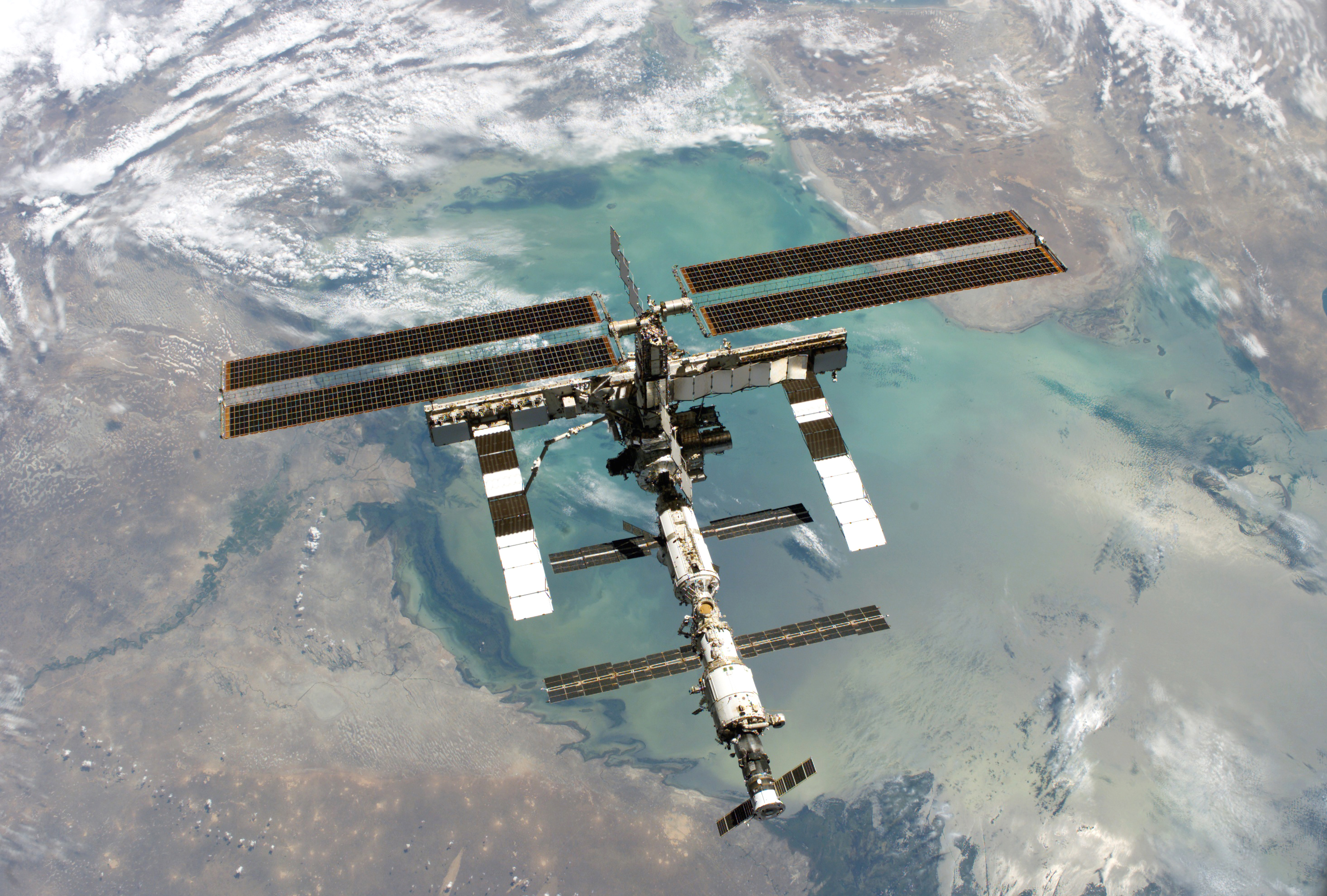
The issue of the qibla in outer space arose publicly in 2007, with Sheikh Muszaphar Shukor's spaceflight to the International Space Station.

The International Space Station (ISS) orbits the Earth at high speed—the direction from it to Mecca changes significantly within a few seconds. Before his flight to the ISS, Sheikh Muszaphar Shukor requested, and the Malaysian National Fatwa Council provided, guidelines which have been translated into multiple languages. The council wrote that the qibla determination should be "based on what is possible" and recommended four options, saying that one should pray toward the first option if possible and, if not, fall back successively on the later ones:

1. the Kaaba itself
2. the position directly above the Kaaba at the altitude of the astronaut's orbit
3. the Earth in general
4. "wherever"

In line with the fatwa council, other Muslim scholars argue for the importance of flexibility and adapting the qibla requirement to what an astronaut is capable of fulfilling. Khaleel Muhammad of San Diego State University opined "God does not take a person to task for that which is beyond his/her ability to work with." Kamal Abdali argued that concentration during a prayer is more important than the exact orientation, and he suggested keeping the qibla direction at the start of a prayer instead of "worrying about possible changes in position". Before Sheikh Muszaphar's mission, at least eight Muslims had flown to space, but none of them publicly discussed issues relating to worship in space.

== See also ==
- Direction of prayer
  - Mizrah, the direction of prayer in the Jewish faith
  - Ad orientem, comparable concept in traditional Christianity
  - Qiblih, the Baháʼí direction of prayer
- Orientation of churches
- Spatial deixis, spatial orientation relevant to an utterance
