= Latitudinally equal-differential polyconic projection =

Pseudoconical compromise map projection

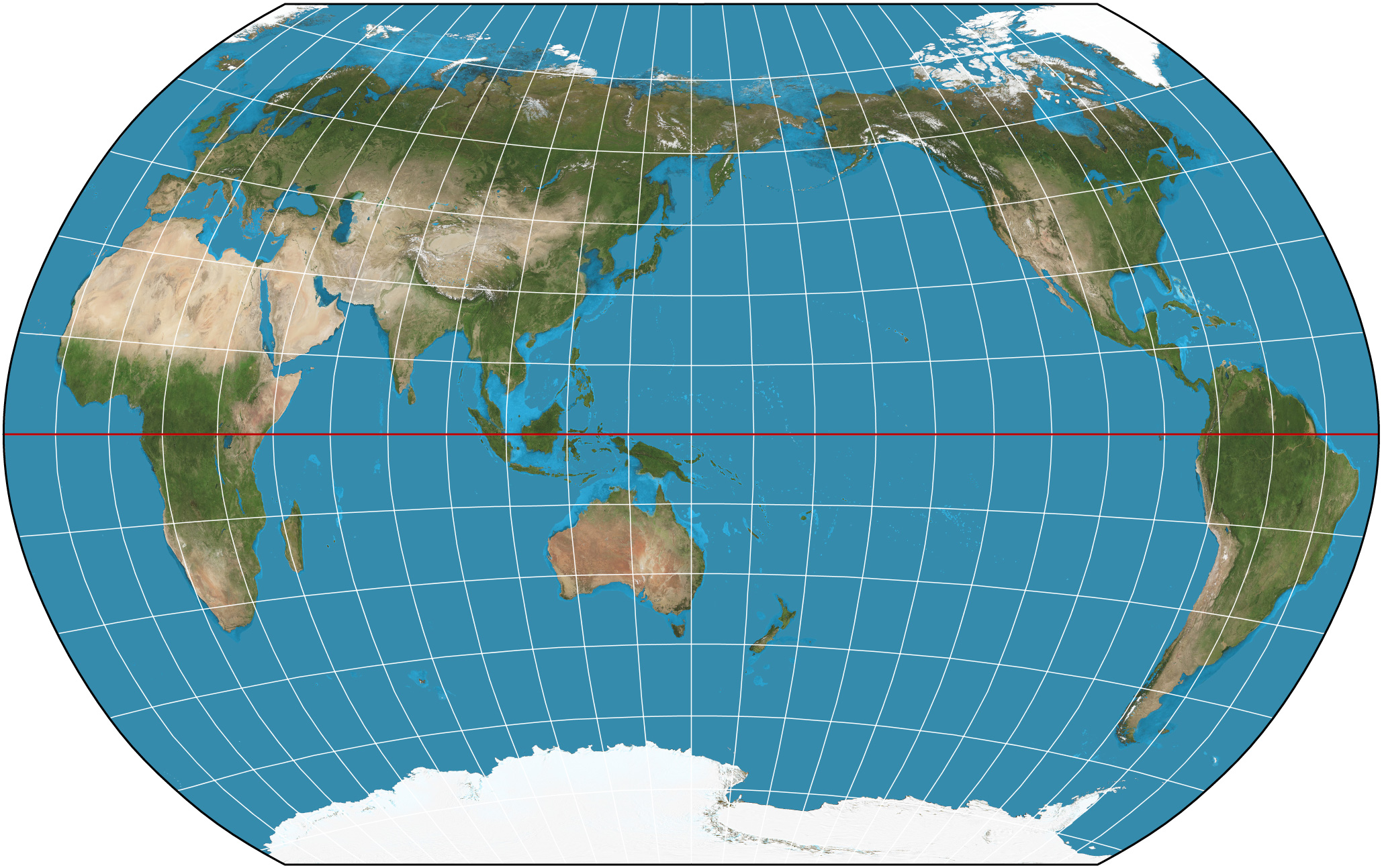
Latitudinally equal-differential polyconic projection of the world, centered on 150°E and with higher latitudes cropped out

With Tissot's indicatrix of deformation

The latitudinally equal-differential polyconic projection (Chinese: 等差分纬线多圆锥投影) is a polyconic map projection in use since 1963 in mainland China. Maps on this projection are produced by China's State Bureau of Surveying and Mapping and other publishers.

== Description ==
As a polyconic projection, the parallels are arcs of circles that are not concentric. The points of no distortion are on the central meridian at 44°N/S latitude. Meridians are convex away from the straight central meridian, and parallels are gently concave away from the equator. The projection is neither equal-area nor conformal; rather, it is a compromise projection.

Maps on this projection do not show the north pole, instead cropping the high latitudes along a straight line. By convention, the projection is centered at 150° such that the Pacific Ocean dominates the center-right of the map and China is placed about 45° west of the central meridian, in a location favorable for low distortion. Greenland is split at the left and right edges of the map, and the northern edge of the map clips the highest regions of the island.

== Mathematical definition ==
The projection was originally defined using a mixture of closed formula and interpolation. The two main formulae are:

- The spacing of latitudes on the central meridian satisfies $y = R( 0.9953537\varphi + 0.01476138 \varphi^3)$, where $R$ is the scaled radius of the earth prior to projection;
- The spacing of longitudes on all parallels satisfies $l=\frac{L(\lambda-\lambda_0)}{2\pi}\left(1.1 - \frac{\lambda-\lambda_0}{10\pi}\right)$, where $L$ is the total projected length of a parallel, and $l$ is the distance from the central meridian measured on arc.This formula is equivalent but different from the one originally given in the book, with longitude difference converted to radians and simplified coefficients.

The projected parallels were in turn defined as the arc passing through three reference points, where the point on the central meridian is calculated as above, and the two symmetric points on the edge is interpolated from a specific table, with the interpolation method not specified.

As its definition is inconvenient for general GIS purposes, various attempts have been made to approximate it algebraically.

== Hǎo's Projection ==
Hǎo's Projection is a generalized version of his own interpolated formula, which allows oblique projections. He values the oblique-projected map as providing a different perspective to the world, and a set of atlases were published with two normal and two oblique projections. It has borne comparison with other map projections, including the Equal Earth projection adopted by the United Nations in 2026.

=== The normal projections ===
The two maps with normal projections were called "Eastern Hemispheric" (Chinese: 东半球版) and "Western Hemispheric" (Chinese: 西半球版), centered around 150° E and 0° respectively. To preserve the shores of projected landmass, Greenland and Chukchi Peninsula respectively are repeated on both edges of the map.

=== The "Northern Hemispheric" projection ===
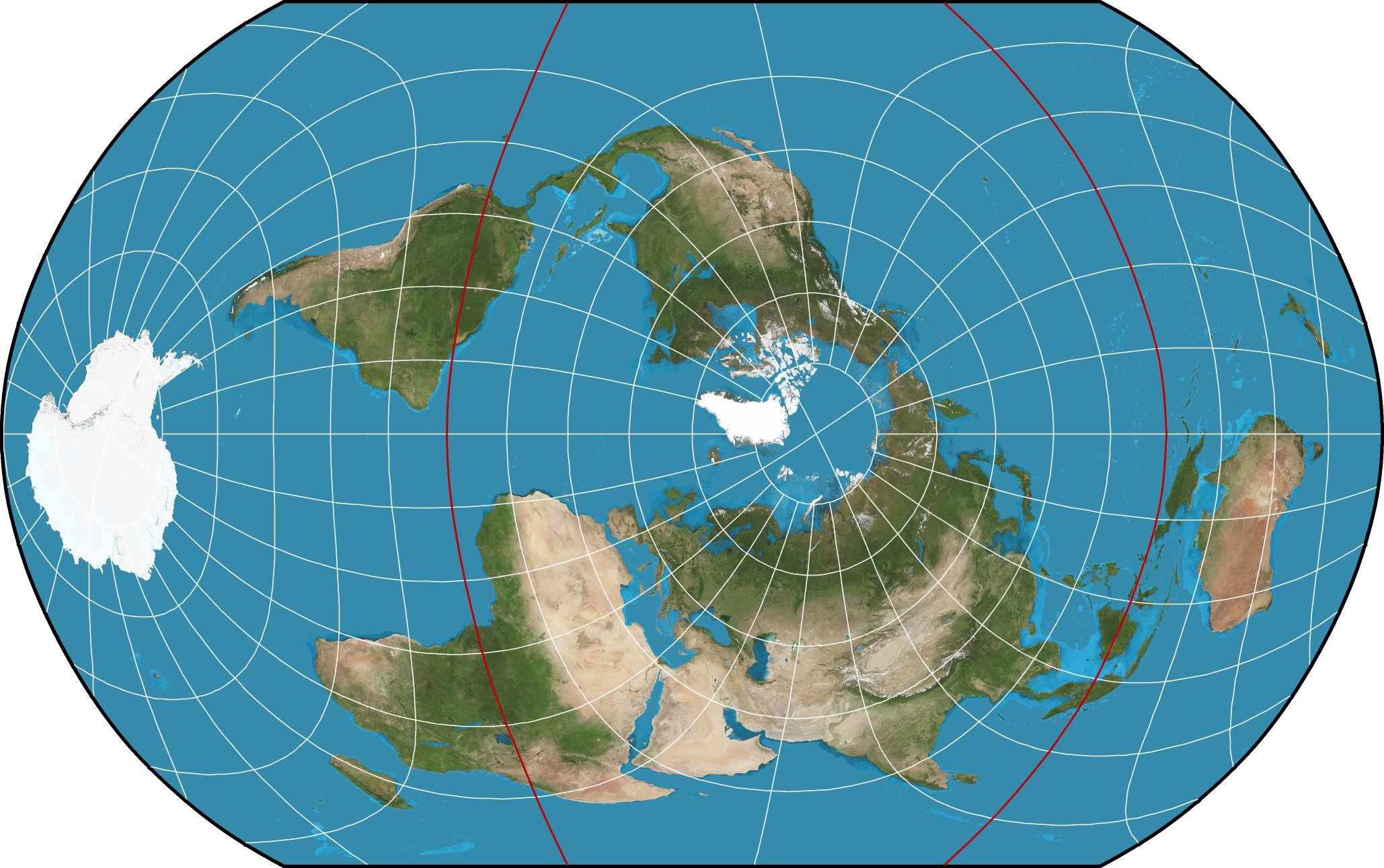
Hǎo's "Northern Hemispheric" projection

The "Northern Hemispheric" (Chinese: 北半球版) projection is an oblique projection where the axes are (0°, 120° W) and (0°, 60° E) respectively, and the central meridian is the semicircle tangential to the 60th parallel north. It was once known as “plane terrestrial globe” for Hǎo perceived its area distortion was minimal.

=== The "Southern Hemispheric" projection ===
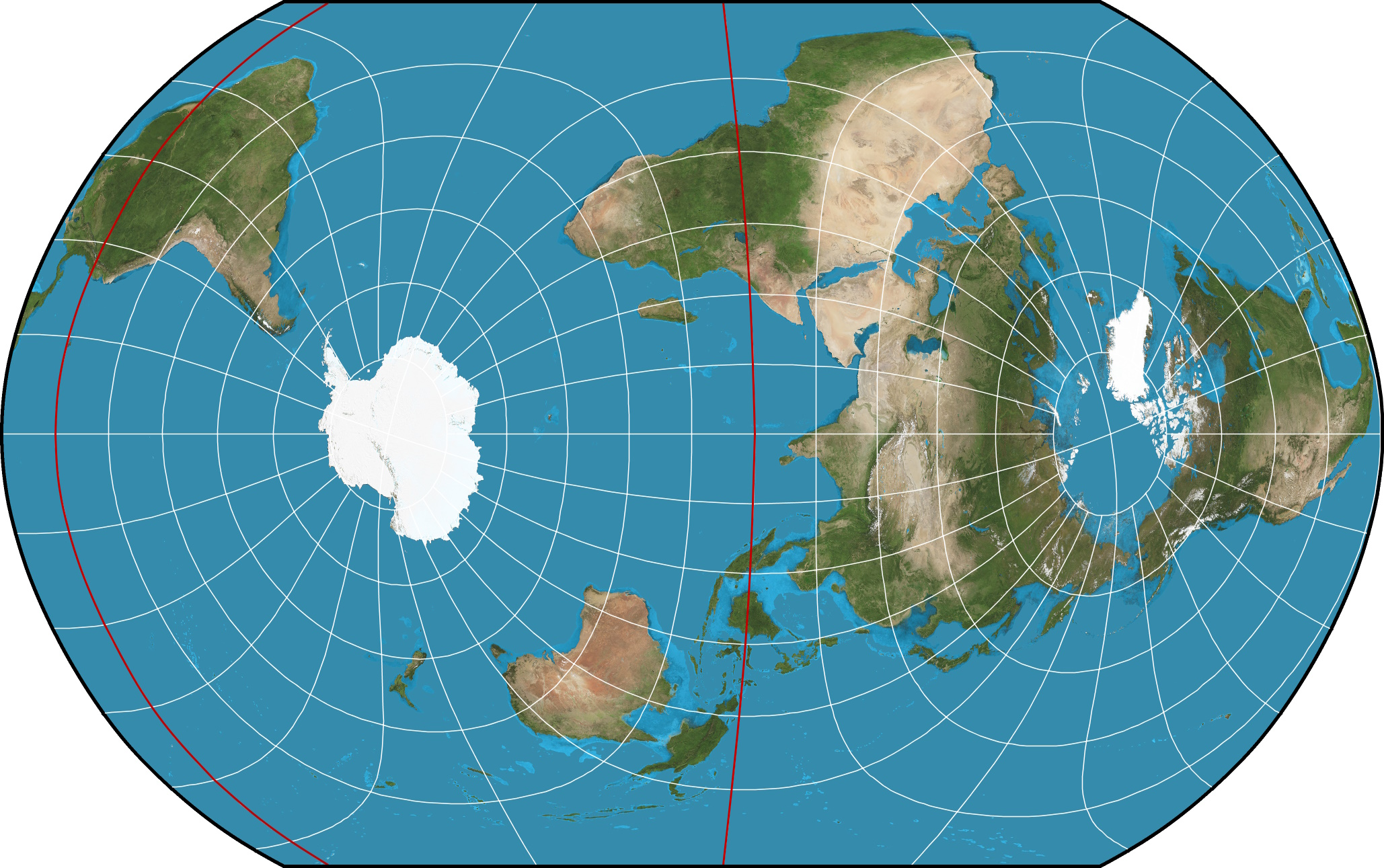
Hǎo's "Southern Hemispheric" projection

The "Southern Hemispheric" (Chinese: 南半球版) projection is an oblique projection where the axes are (0°, 15° W) and (0°, 165° E) respectively, and the central meridian is the semicircle tangential to the 15th parallel south.

== See also ==
- List of map projections
- Winkel tripel projection, which has similar characteristics.
