= Snake Projection =

Map projection for linear projects

Generating a trend line of zero distortion that follows the route of a long and linear project

The Snake Projection is a continuous map projection typically used as the planar coordinate system for realizing low distortion throughout long linear engineering projects.

== Details ==
The Snake Projection was originally developed by University College London and Network Rail to provide a continuous low distortion projection for the West Coast Mainline infrastructure works. The parameters defining each Snake Projection are tailored for the specific project. The most typical use is with large-scale linear engineering projects such as rail infrastructure; however, the projection is equally applicable to any application requiring a low distortion grid along a linear route (for example pipelines and roads). The name of the projection is derived from the sinuous snake-like nature of the projects it may be designed for. Typical map projection distance distortion characteristics of a Snake Projection are minimal over the whole route within approximately 20 km (12 mi) of the centre line.

The principal advantage of the projection is that, for the corridor defining the design space, distances measured on the ground have a nearly one-to-one relationship with distances in coordinate space (i.e. no scale factor need be applied to convert between distances in grid and distances on the ground). The length of the applicable corridor is variable on a project basis; however, when required, the projection can extend over several hundreds of kilometres to achieve grid distortion of less than 20 parts per million along the route. The main disadvantage is that away from the design corridor, the distortion of the projection is not controlled.

The Snake Projection is suited for engineering purposes due to its low distortion characteristics. An example of its differentiation from mapping grids is the 60 m (200 ft) increase in length of the London to Birmingham section of the HS2 rail line, purely due to the more accurate grid representation compared to the length when using the national mapping coordinate system British National Grid.

== Usage ==
The Snake Projection is the engineering coordinate system used for a significant proportion of primary rail routes in the UK, including that of the HS2 London to Birmingham high speed line. For the London to Glasgow West Coast Main Line, the distortion in the Snake Projection used is no greater than 20 parts per million within 5 km (3.1 mi) of either side of the track.

== Implementation ==
The Snake Projection algorithm converts between geographical and grid coordinates; however, the method of technical implementation can vary. One method of implementing a Snake Projection is to define using an NTv2 geodetic transformation coupled with a standard parameterised map projection (such as Transverse Mercator); this is increasing in popularity due to better compatibility with CAD and GIS software. The global EPSG geodetic coordinate system database features several snake projection definitions through the NTv2 approach. Other implementations include those published through the SnakeGrid organisation.

== See also ==
- List of map projections
- Surveying
