= James Ireland Craig =

Scottish mathematician who died in the 1952 Cairo Fire

- Born: 24 February 1868; Buckhaven, Fife, Scotland
- Died: 26 January 1952 (aged 83); Cairo, Egypt
- Occupation: mathematician

James Ireland Craig FRSE CBE (1868–1952) was a Scottish mathematician, meteorologist and creator of the Craig retroazimuthal projection.

== Life ==
He was born on 24 February 1868 in Buckhaven the son of Captain T M Craig, a pioneer in the development of Borneo, and his wife Agnes. He was educated at Daniel Stewart's College in Edinburgh, where he was school dux for 1885. He then attended Edinburgh University and then Emmanuel College, Cambridge, graduating MA in 1892.

In 1893 he became a Master, teaching mathematics at Eton College then at Winchester College from 1895. In 1896 he moved to Egypt to work for the Egyptian government. In 1908 he was elected a Fellow of the Royal Society of Edinburgh for his contributions to cartography. His proposers were George Chrystal, William J MacDonald, John Alison and John Brown Clark.

He created, in 1909, the Craig retroazimuthal projection that preserves true directions on a map to a specified location, such as Mecca, which it why it is often called the Mecca projection.

He returned to Britain during the First World War and was based in London at the Ministry of Food. In the aftermath of the war he was creator Food Controller 1918-20 for Upper Silesia (now SW Poland). In 1925 he returned to Egypt as Controller General, then, from 1928 to 1934, was Financial Secretary to the Egyptian Census. In 1934 (aged already 66) he was made UK Government Commissioner of Customs. He finally retired from employment in 1947, aged 79. He still spent much of his time in Egypt.

In 1942 he was made a Commander of the Order of the British Empire (CBE) for his services in Egypt.

He was killed aged 83 in a deliberate fire at the Turf Club in Cairo, set by rioters on 26 January 1952 during the Cairo Fire.

== Family ==
In 1897, he married Isabella Wilson, who died in 1948.

== Publications ==
- The Rains of the Nile Basin and Nile Floods of 1909 (1910)
- General Theory of Map Projections (1910)
- Anthropometry of Modern Egyptians (1911)
- Some General Principles of Surveying (1911)
- Egyptian Irrigation (1913)
- Elements of Analytical Geometry (1930) (published in both English and Arabic)
