= Quartic authalic projection =

Pseudocylindrical equal-area map projection

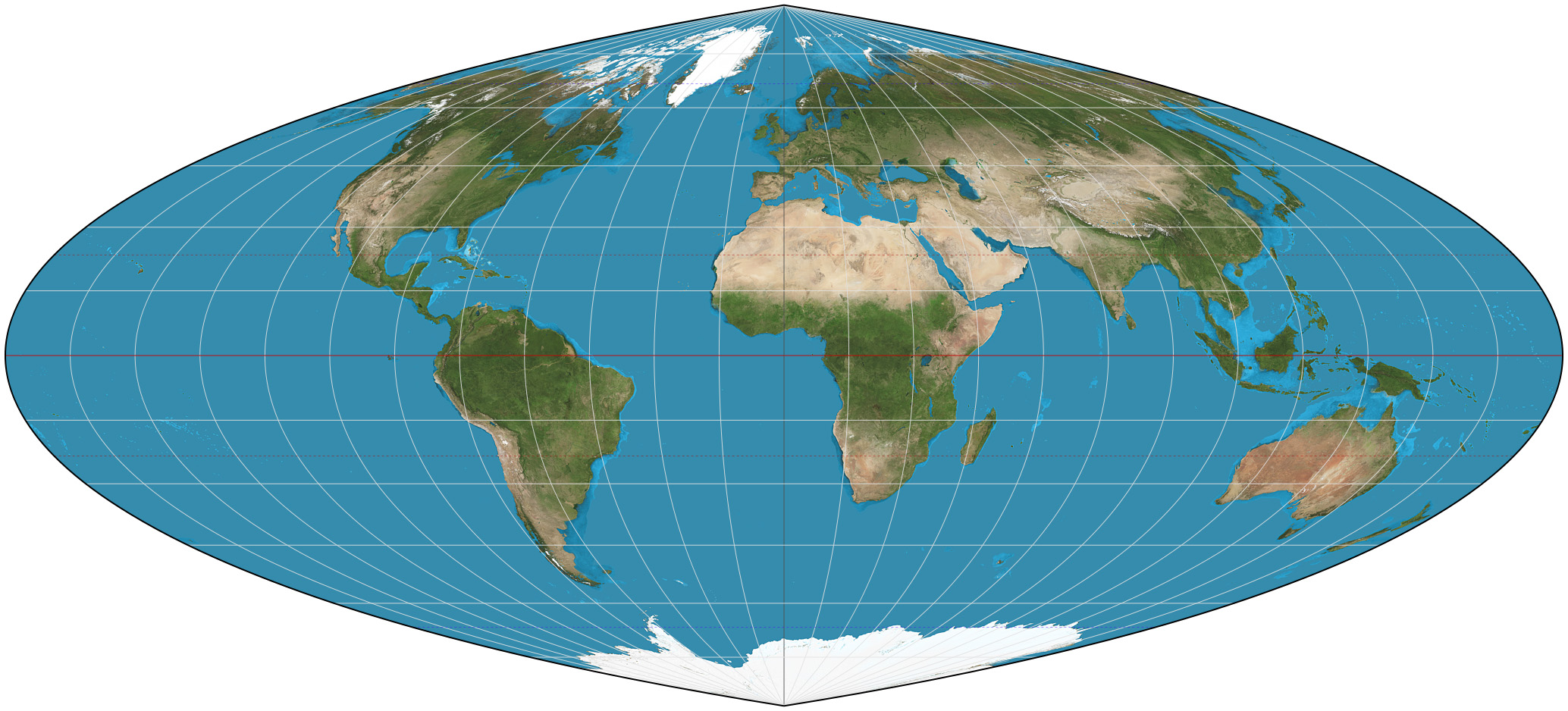
Quartic authalic projection of the world. 15° graticule.

In cartography, the quartic authalic projection is an equal-area projection developed by Karl Siemon in 1937 and independently by Oscar S. Adams in 1944. The meridians in this projection are fourth-order polynomial curves. The projection is similar to the sinusoidal projection in appearance and distortion properties.
