= International Map of the World =

Global mapping project in the 20th century

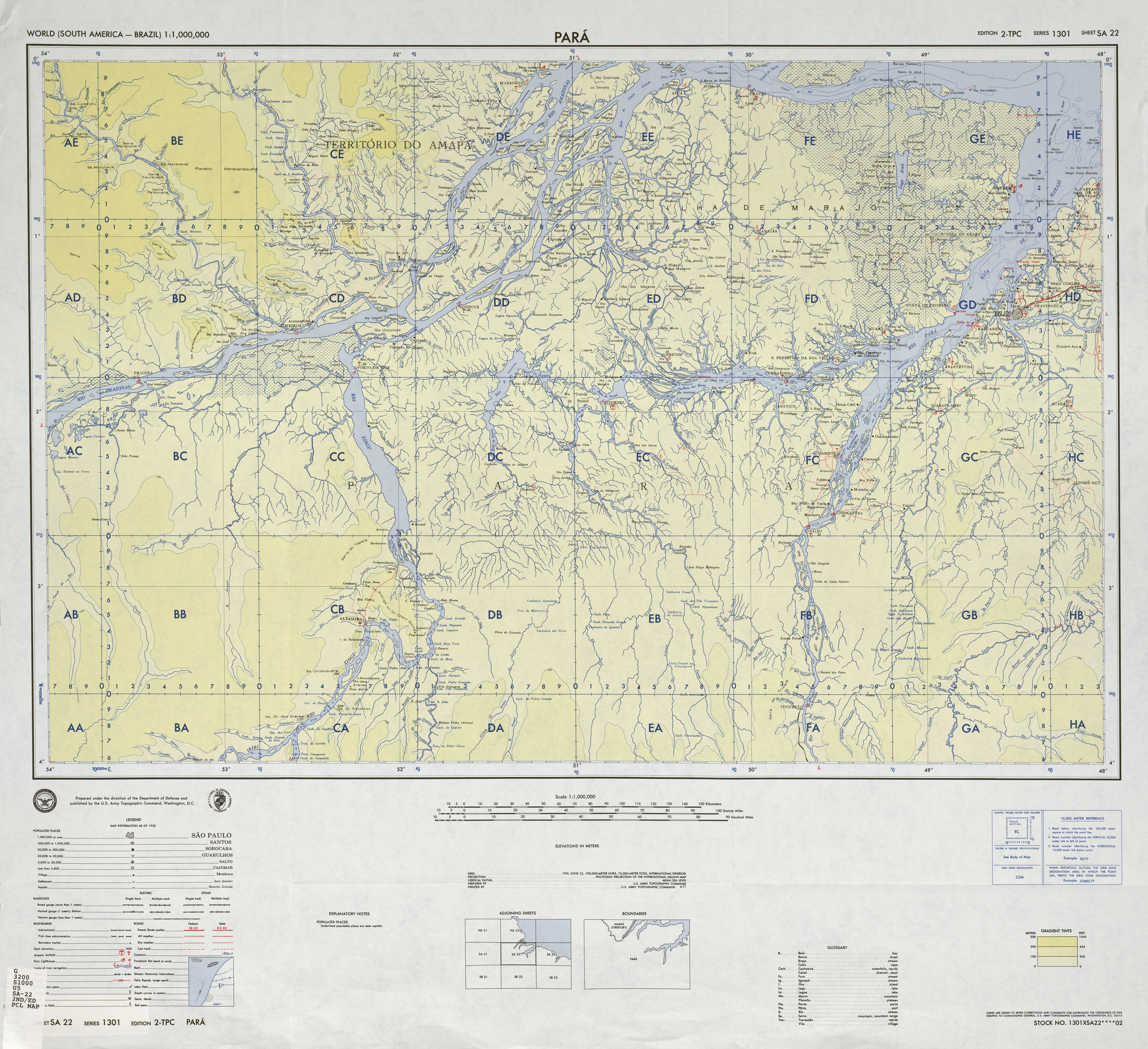
The map of the mouth of the River Amazon

The International Map of the World (IMW; also the Millionth Map of the World, after its scale of 1:1 000 000) was a project to create a complete map of the world according to internationally agreed standards. It was first proposed by the German geographer Albrecht Penck in 1891.

The Central Bureau of the Map of the World was established in London. After the Second World War, UNESCO took over the project. By 1953, 400 sheets had been produced. The completed sheets became outdated before the project had produced a full set of maps, and by the 1960s was being dismissed as being of no practical use. The project was no longer monitored by the 1990s.

== Beginnings ==
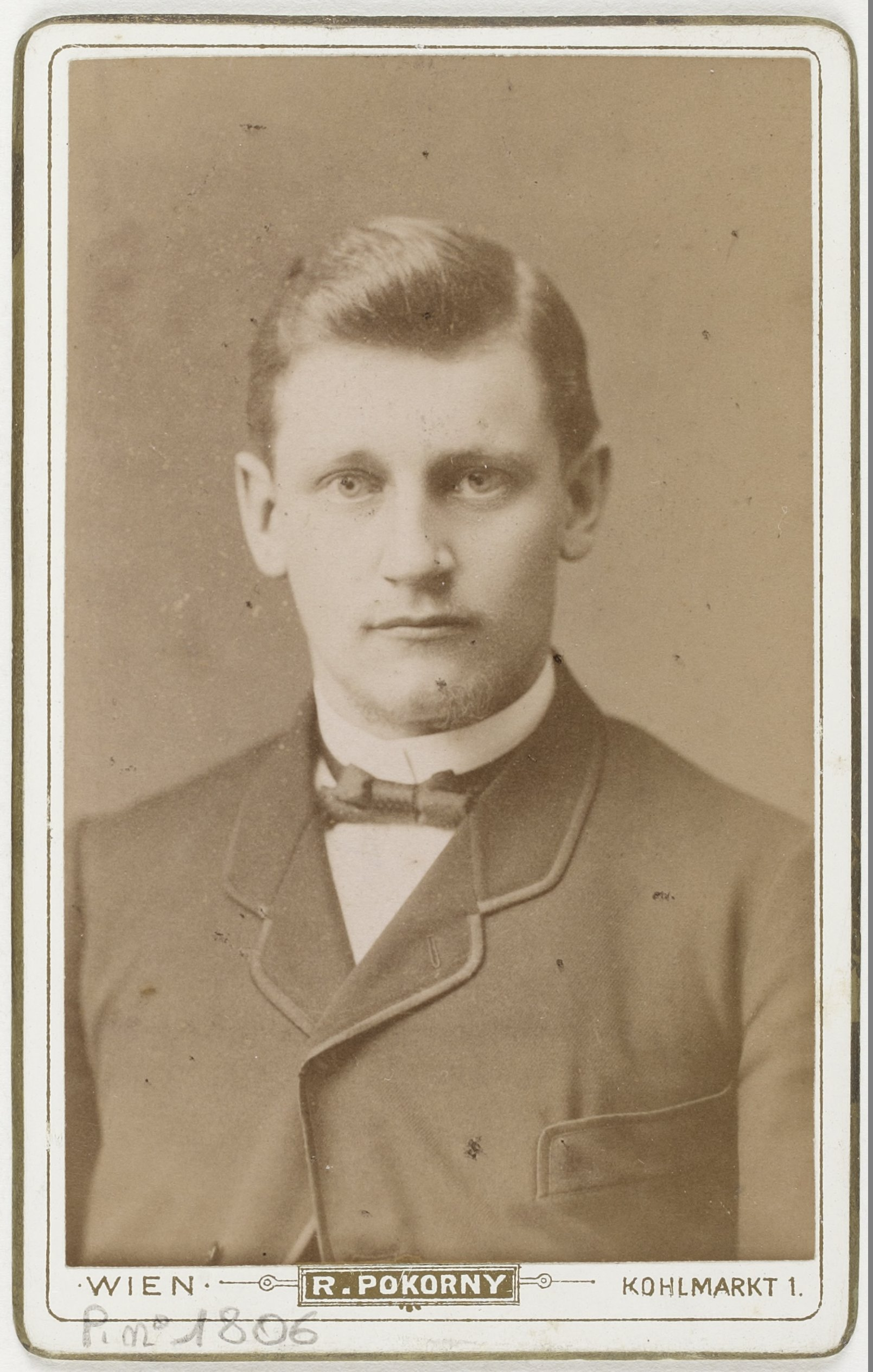
The German geographer Albrecht Penck, who first proposed the idea of the International Map of the World

The International Map of the World was the brainchild of the German geographer Albrecht Penck, who presented his idea in 1891 at the 5th International Geographical Congress in Bern. He argued that the maps of the world lacked a consistent style, and that a uniform world map was feasible, as sufficient information was available. Writing in 1893 in The Geographical Journal, he described the problems associated with maps that then existed, noting "the interests of civilized life make good maps a necessity". Penck considered it important that the maps that represent an area "...not merely as a piece of land limited by political boundaries, but as a region in the frame of its natural surroundings".

Penck's proposal was discussed at conferences of the International Geographical Congress in 1895, 1899, 1904, and 1908. His idea was to produce a set of maps that would include both geophysical and human geographical data, obtained by means of the most precise methods then known. He envisioned that 2500 maps would be made using the polyconic projection, which would mean the maps fitted almost seamlessly together. He expressed the hope that governments would fund what was a non-political mapping project, and suggested that geographical societies, academic institutions, and philanthropic organizations might need to be relied upon in the absence of governments' assistance with the project.

In 1909 the First International Conference in London, which was attended by the representatives of 10 nations, laid down the new project's rules and specifications. The French government agreed to accept the use of the Greenwich Meridian, and the British government accepting the use of the metre. By 1913, the grid reference system had been completed and funding had been promised from government agencies around the world (the United States not included); the process of making the maps then began.

== Description ==
The International Map of the World (IMW), also known as the Millionth Map of the World, after its scale of 1:1 000 000, was a project to create a complete map of the world according to internationally agreed standards. Roads were depicted in red, towns and railways were depicted in black, and the labels were written in the Roman alphabet.

=== Map indexing system ===
Map index of northern and central Asia

A map indexing system was developed for dividing the globe into sections spanning six degrees of longitude by four degrees latitude. Longitudinal slices are numbered 1 (180°–174° West) through 60 (174°–180° East). Latitudinal slices are named NA (0°–4° North) through NV (84°–88° North) and SA (0°–4° South) through SV (84°–88° South).

Due to shortening of longitudinal distances with increasing latitude, longitudinal span beyond 60 degrees latitude doubles to twelve degrees. Beyond 76 degrees it doubles again to 24 degrees. Therefore, the complete map would have divided the world into 2,160 slices, each covering about 236,000 square kilometres (91,000 sq mi).

This indexing system outlived the international project and is still used in national and international mapping programs by Australia, Russia, United States, and China.

== Development and decline ==
The Central Bureau of the Map of the World was established at the Ordnance Survey in London. By 1939, 350 maps of the 1000 planned had been completed. After the Second World War, the United Nations took over the project. By 1953, 400 of about 1,000 sheets had been produced; though this covered most of the land surface outside North America, some of the sheets were decades out of date, and almost none of the open ocean was covered. The United States completed most of the maps for its domestic territory, and maps which included the border with Canada were completed by whichever country had the most territory in the quadrangle. In 1964, Arthur H. Robinson dismissed the IMW as "cartographic wallpaper" of no practical use. There were few updates thereafter and in 1989, UNESCO declared the project was no longer feasible and stopped monitoring it.

== Gallery ==
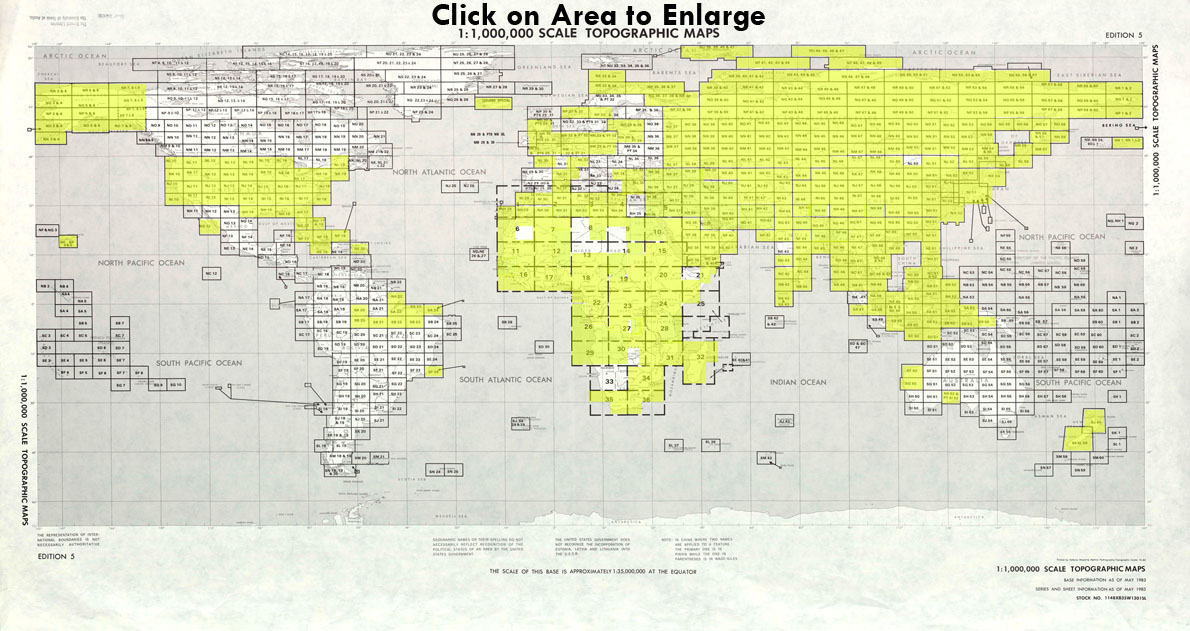
Index map from the International Map of the World 1:1,000,000

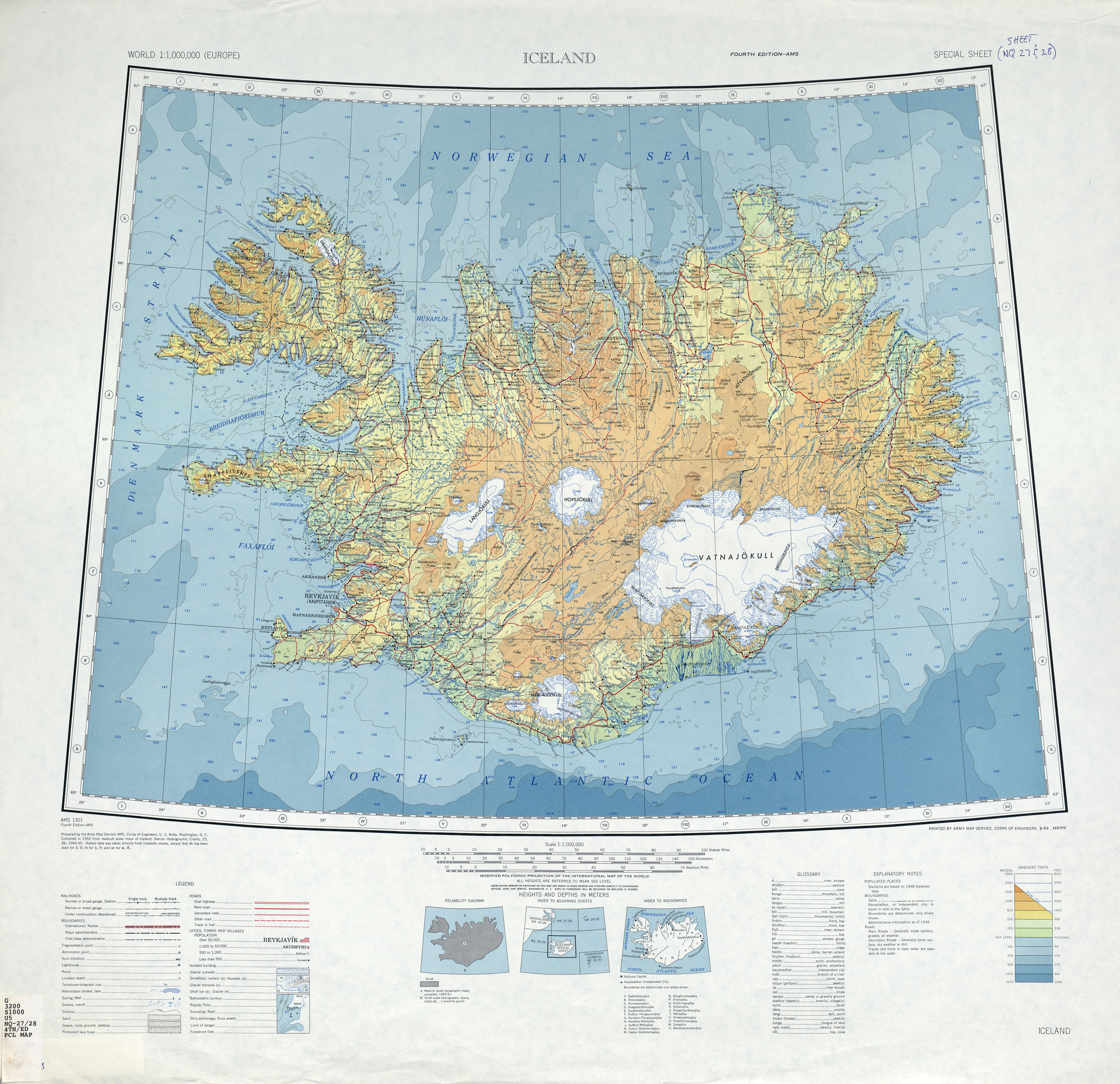
Iceland

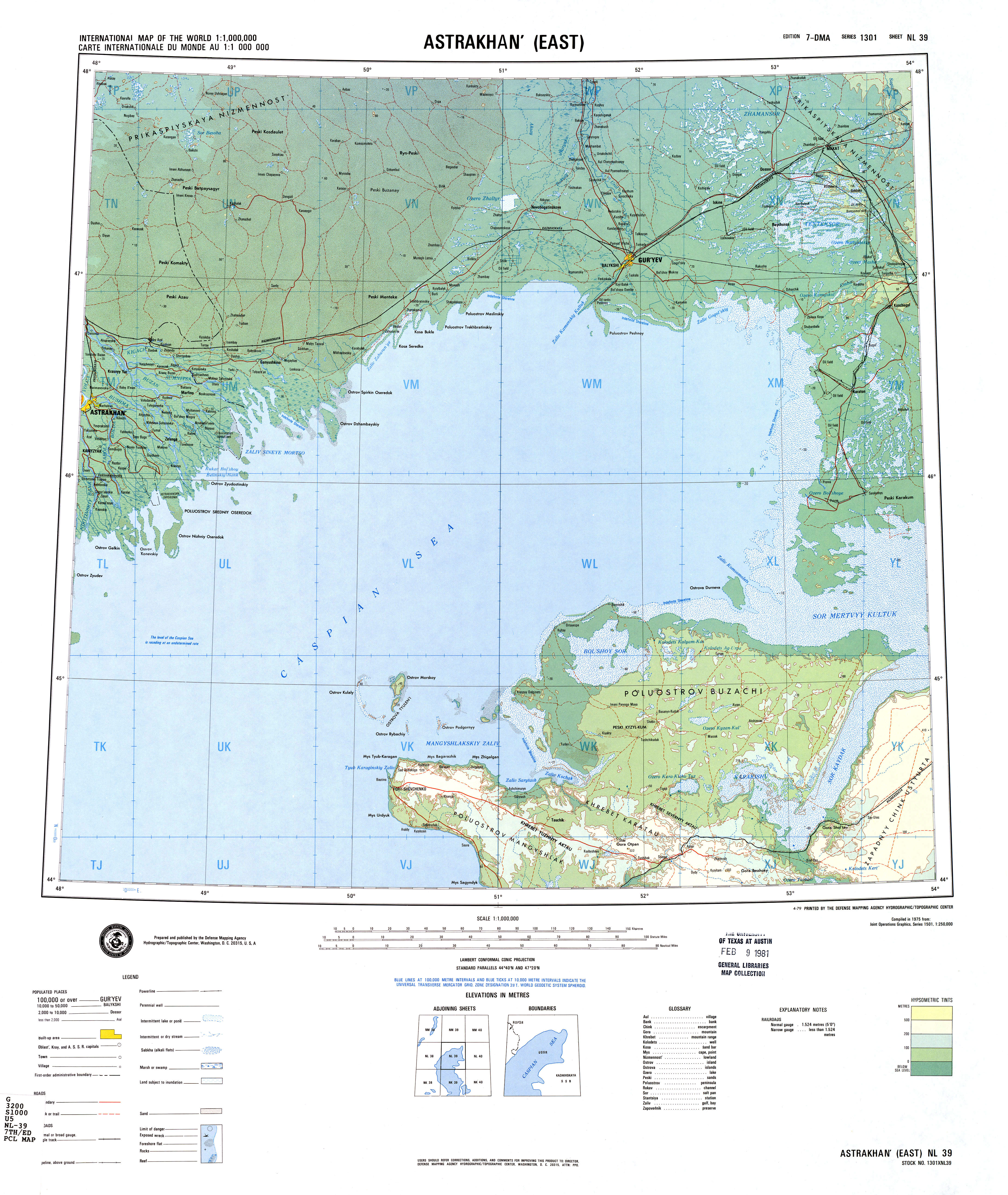
The northern Caspian Sea area

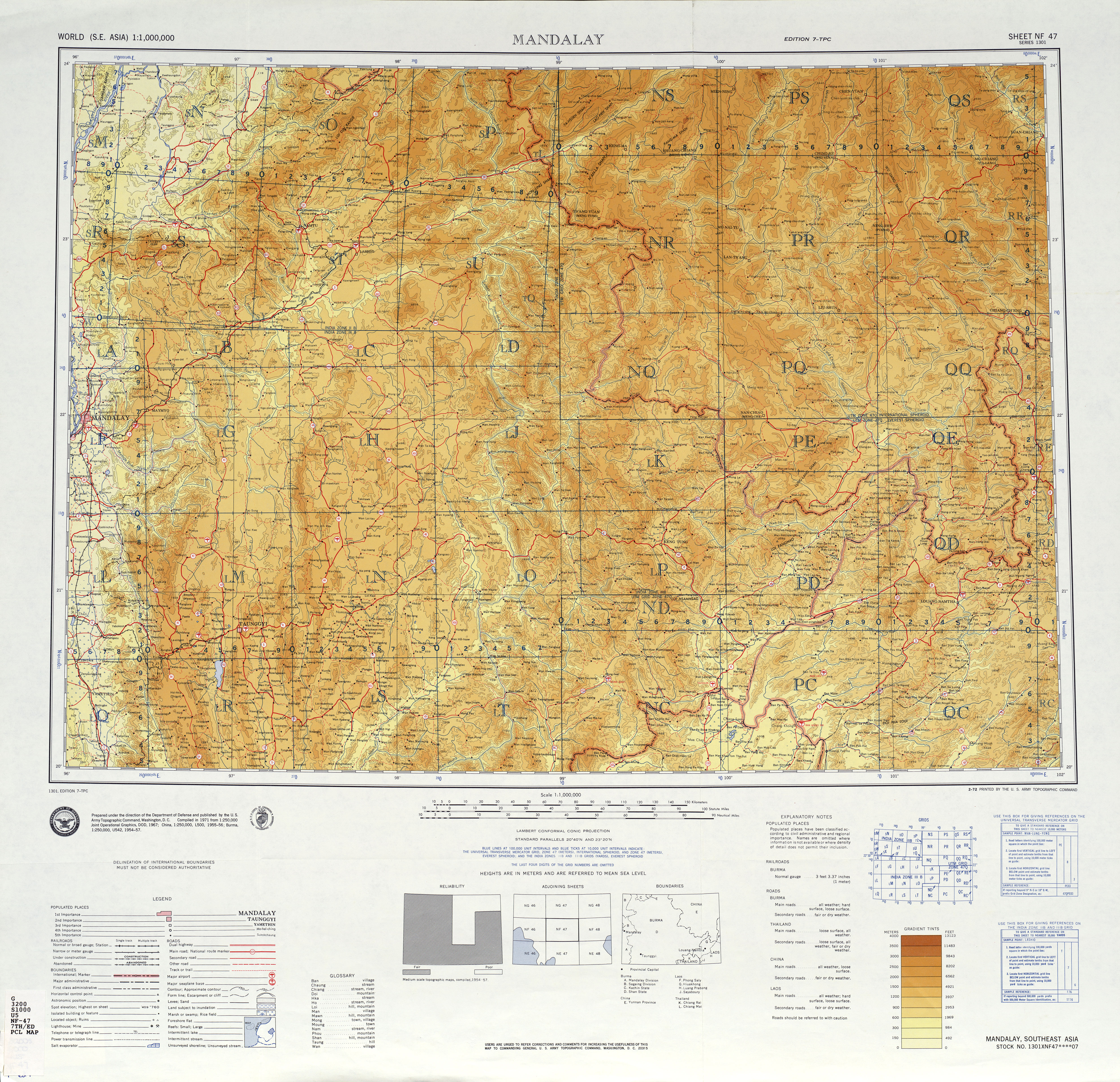
The Mandalay region of Burma

== Sources ==
- Boggs, S. W. (1929). "The International Map of the World". The Military Engineer Society of American Military Engineers, Journal. Washington, D.C. 21 (116). Society of American Military Engineers: 112–114. ISSN 0462-4890. JSTOR 44567655. Archived from the original on 2021-02-09.
- Brotton, Jerry (2014). Great Maps: The World's Masterpieces Explored and Explained. London: Dorling Kindersley Ltd. ISBN 978-1-4654-2463-1.
- Merrick, Helen Hynson (1969). Lands and Peoples: British Isles and Western Europe. Vol. 1. New York: The Grolier Society. OCLC 489814317.
- Nekola, Peter (2013). "Looking Back at the International Map of the World". Environment, Space, Place. 5 (1): 27–45. doi:10.7761/ESP.5.1.27. ISSN 2066-5377.
- Osmańczyk, Edmund Jan; Mango, Anthony (2003). Encyclopedia of the United Nations and International Agreements. Vol. G to M. New York: Routledge. ISBN 978-04159-3-922-5.
- Pearson, Alastair; Taylor, D. R. Fraser; Kline, Karen D.; Heffernan, Michael (2006). "Cartographic ideals and geopolitical realities: international maps of the world from the 1890s to the present". The Canadian Geographer. 50 (2): 149–176. Bibcode:2006CGeog..50..149P. doi:10.1111/j.0008-3658.2006.00133.x. ISSN 0008-3658. Archived from the original on 2023-04-04.
- Robinson, A. H. (2013) [1965]. "The Future of the International Map". The Cartographic Journal. 2 (1): 23–26. doi:10.1179/caj.1965.2.1.23. ISSN 0008-7041.
