= Lecznicza Street =

Street in Łódź, Poland

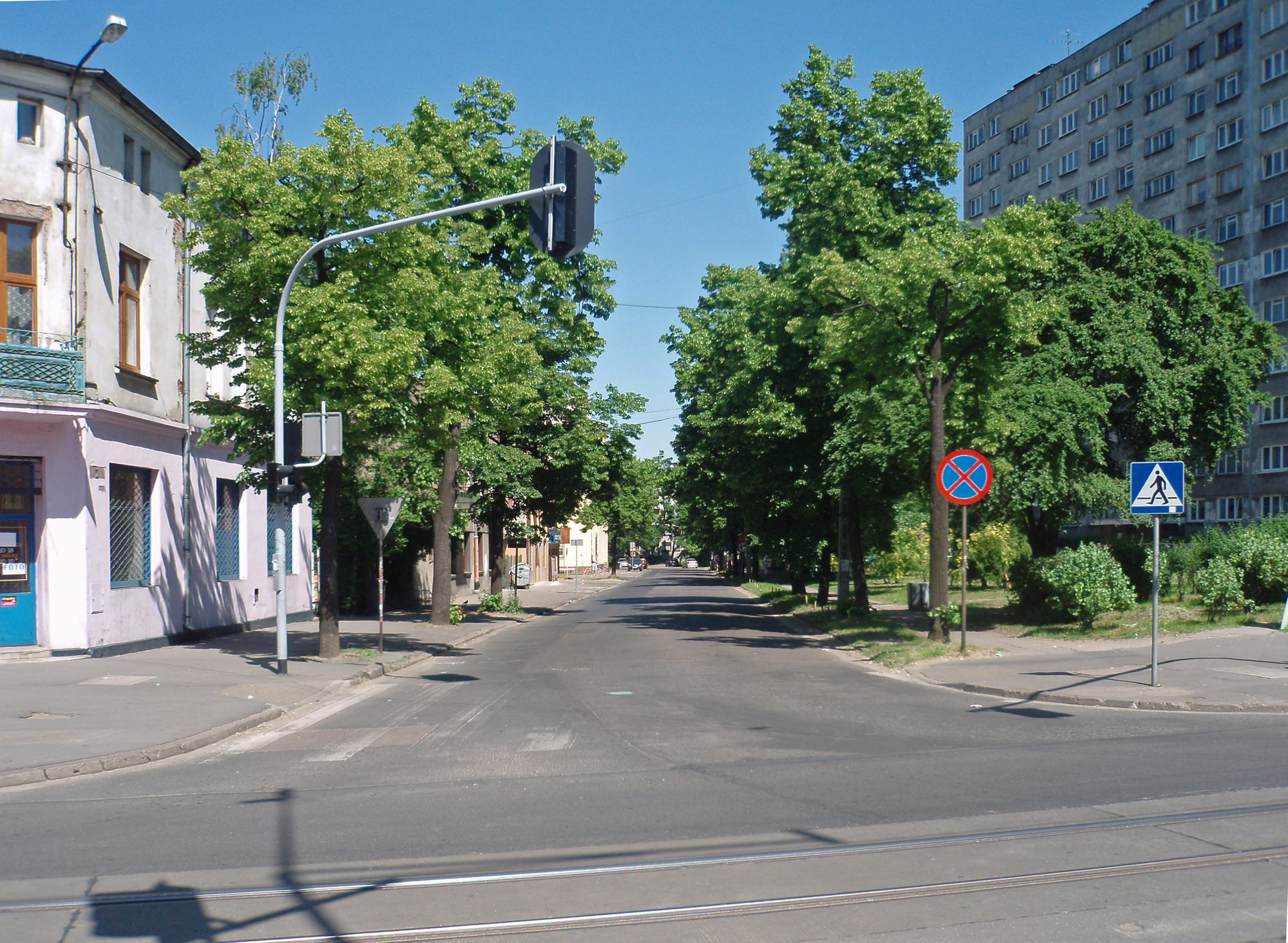
- View of Lecznicza Street from Rzgowska Street (June 2008). On the right – the tallest residential building on the street (11 stories), built in 1972
- Interactive map of Lecznicza Street
- Former name(s): Mała Street; Zimna Street; Kalte Straße; Heilanstaltsweg; Annweilerweg
- Part of: Chojny
- Length: 0.3 km (0.19 mi)
- Location: Łódź, Poland
- Coordinates: 51°44′3.7″N 19°28′17.0″E

Lecznicza Street is a street in Łódź, Poland, approximately 0.3 km long with 17 address numbers, situated in the Górna district within the Chojny area of the Łódź City Information System.

It starts at the intersection with Rzgowska Street and ends beyond 17 Lecznicza Street, transitioning into Podmiejska Street, which leads to Jarosław Dąbrowski Street. From its beginning to 13a Lecznicza Street, it is classified as a private road. The status of the segment from 13a to 17 Lecznicza Street is unclear, as it is not categorized in the public roads list. Two-way traffic is permitted along its entire length. Piaseczna Street extends southwest from Lecznicza Street beyond the Rzgowska Street intersection.

The street falls entirely within the pastoral jurisdiction of the Roman Catholic Parish of Our Lady of the Angels in Łódź.

== History ==
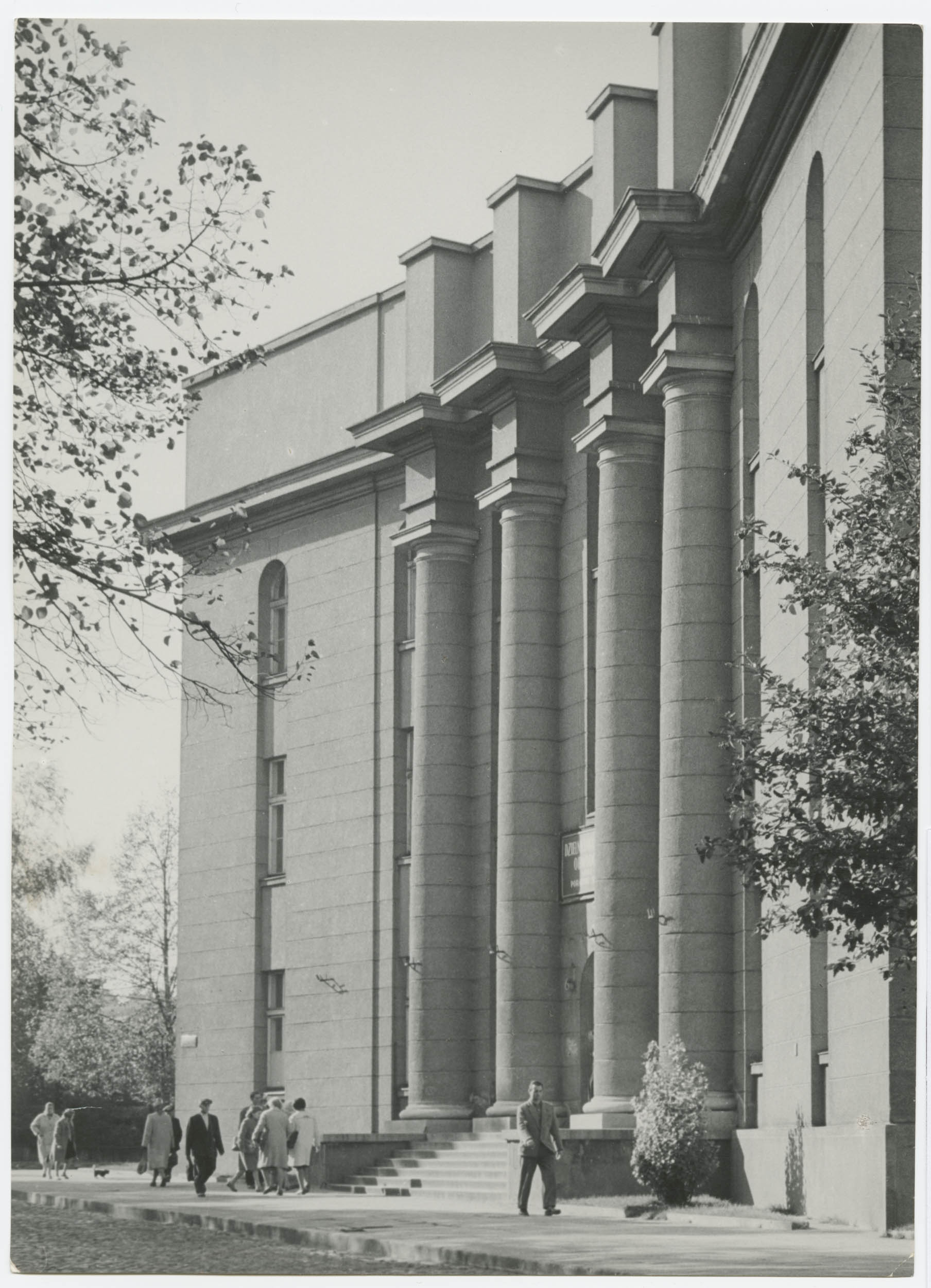
Former Social Insurance Clinic building – main entrance (1950s/60s)

Lecznicza Street was laid out after 1914, absent from a city plan of that year, likely in the mid-1910s, on land from the village of Dąbrowa, annexed to Łódź by a Council of Ministers decree on 18 October 1906. Słownik nazewnictwa miejskiego Łodzi suggests it was initially named Mała Street, though another source disputes this. By 1923, it appeared as Zimna Street in Eugeniusz Romer and Juliusz Jurczyński's Atlas krajoznawczy województwa łódzkiego, linking Rzgowska Street to Dolna Street (now Podmiejska Street) without cross streets. A Łódź plan published between 1925 and 1930 by A. I. Ostrowski shows Mała Street as an extension of an unnamed street (likely Zimna) beyond Podmiejska Street, heading northeast, renamed Adam Asnyk Street in the early 1930s.

Before 1927, the health insurance fund acquired a plot on Zimna Street for a clinic, but construction was delayed due to the city's repeated revisions to the street's layout and the addition of Kasowa Street. The plans changed three times, forcing the fund to adjust its project. In late 1926 or early 1927, preliminary work began, but the city halted it for a fourth revision, leading to a complaint to provincial authorities.

The current name, Lecznicza Street, was likely assigned between May and June 1931, following the construction of the Social Insurance Clinic (now Municipal Clinic at 6 Lecznicza Street). It appeared as Zimna Street in Dziennik Zarządu m. Łodzi on 26 May 1931 and as Lecznicza Street by 9 June 1931. By then, the street had its current layout, ending in a fork beyond the clinic. Its northern extension was Podmiejska Street, leading diagonally to Czerwony Rynek and Rzgowska Street, while its northeastern extension was Adam Asnyk Street (now replaced by buildings at 15 and 17 Lecznicza Street), reaching nearly to Juliusz Słowacki Street. Kasowa Street had become a cross street.

In early 1931, the city established a playground near the new clinic, covering about 2 hectares on land owned by Ferdinand Kenig's heirs, who permitted its use and offered to exchange it for part of the city's clay pit on Pabianicka Street. The site was proposed for permanent Jordan gardens and city squares.

From 2011 to 2013, Lecznicza Street ranked 299th out of 362 Łódź streets for traffic accidents, with one accident and one injury.

Following residents' requests, new trees, benches, trash bins, and a "kiss & ride" zone for quick drop-offs at the clinic were added. Residents had long sought solutions for traffic and parking issues, which had damaged the green strip along the street. The renovation was completed in spring 2025.

=== Name changes ===
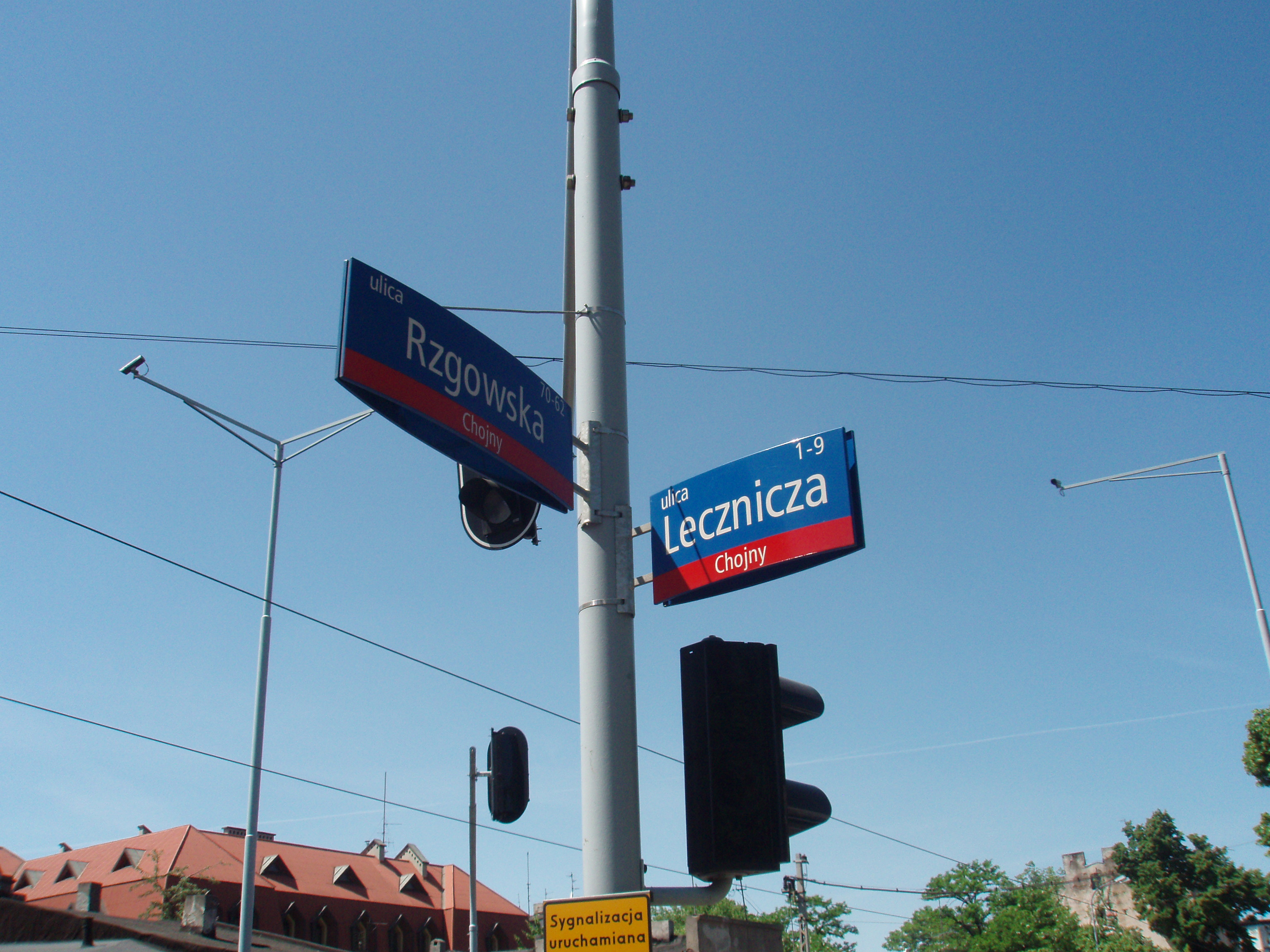
Current street sign at the intersection with Rzgowska Street

Period	Name
1915	Mała Street
1915	Zimna Street
1915–1918	Kalte Straße
1918–1931	Zimna Street
1931–1940	Lecznicza Street
1940	Heilanstaltsweg
1940–1945	Annweilerweg
1945–present	Lecznicza Street

== Notable sites ==
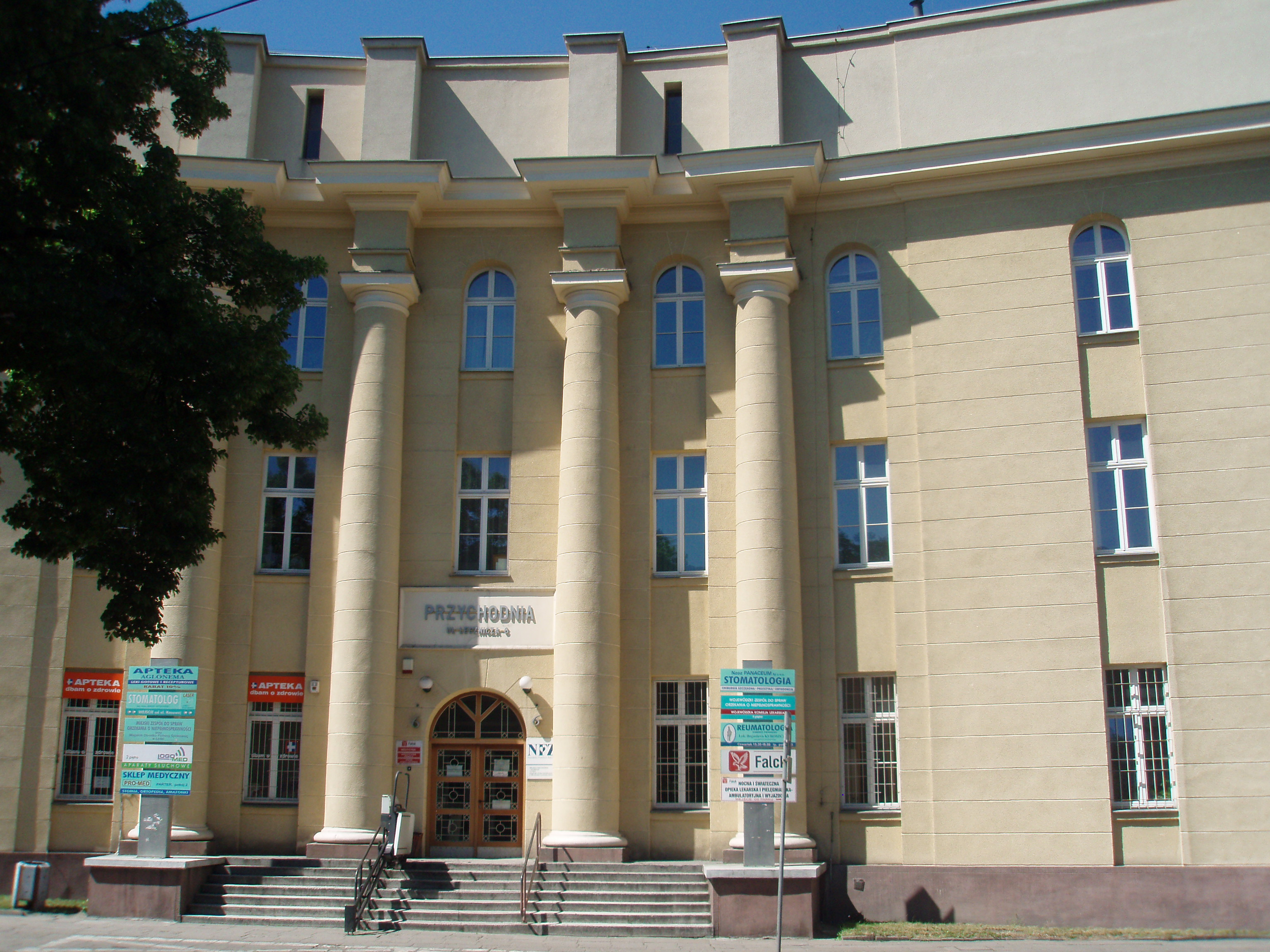
Municipal Clinic building (former Social Insurance Clinic) – main entrance

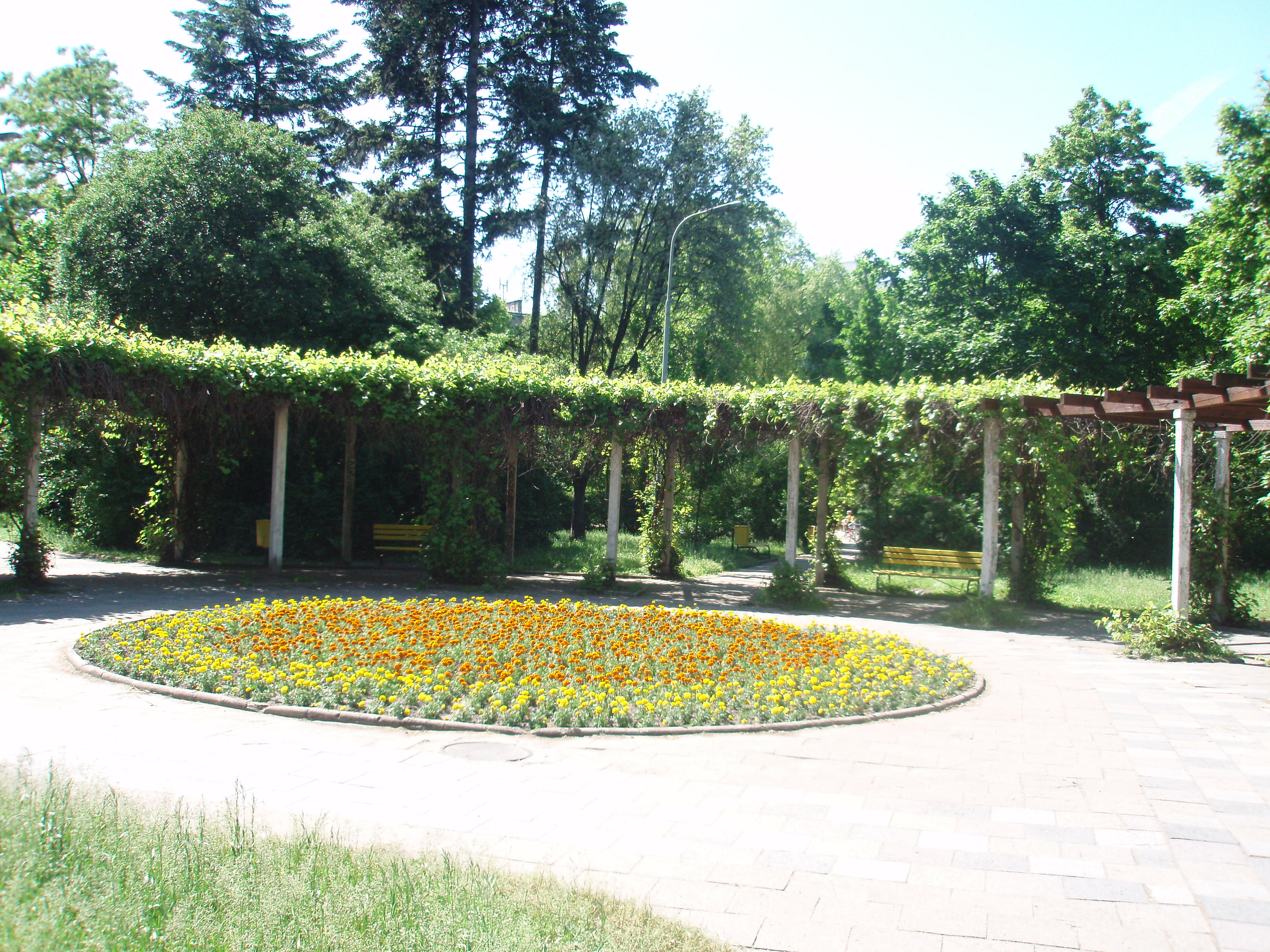
Municipal Park – view of the pergola at the park's center

- 6 Lecznicza Street – Modernist Municipal Clinic, built from 1927 to 1930 by Warsaw architect Stefan Kraskowski for the Social Insurance Clinic, listed in the register of monuments. It is Łódź's oldest and largest operating clinic. In September 1939, it served as a military field hospital for bombing victims, organized with scouts from the Romuald Traugutt 3rd Łódź Scout Troop at Mikołaj Kopernik High School, later becoming a hospital for prisoners of war. In the 1950s, it housed Łódź's first oncology clinics for gynecological oncology and general oncology. Renovated from 2001 to 2003, it hosts the Łódź-Górna Healthcare Team, Falck Medycyna Łódź Region, and the Aglonema pharmacy.
- Municipal Park – Łódź's first post-World War II park, covering about 2 hectares, designed by K. Marcinkowski, located behind the Municipal Clinic.

== Address numbers and postal codes ==
- Even numbers: 2–6
- Odd numbers: 1–17
- Postal code: 93-173 (entire street)

== Nearby points of interest ==
- Arboretum – Residential building at 4 Łukasiński Street, completed in April 2012, 212 m north of the park. It incorporates two reconstructed walls from the Aleksander Schicht Factory, built before World War I, noted for its Art Nouveau brick facade, unusual for a factory in a park-like setting.
- People of the Sea Monument – Opposite the entrance to the Joachim Lelewel High School at 21 Podmiejska Street, 340 m away, unveiled on 22 March 1984. The school houses a Maritime Museum, opened on 22 March 1993.
