= Eduard Brückner =

German geographer and climatologist (1862–1927)

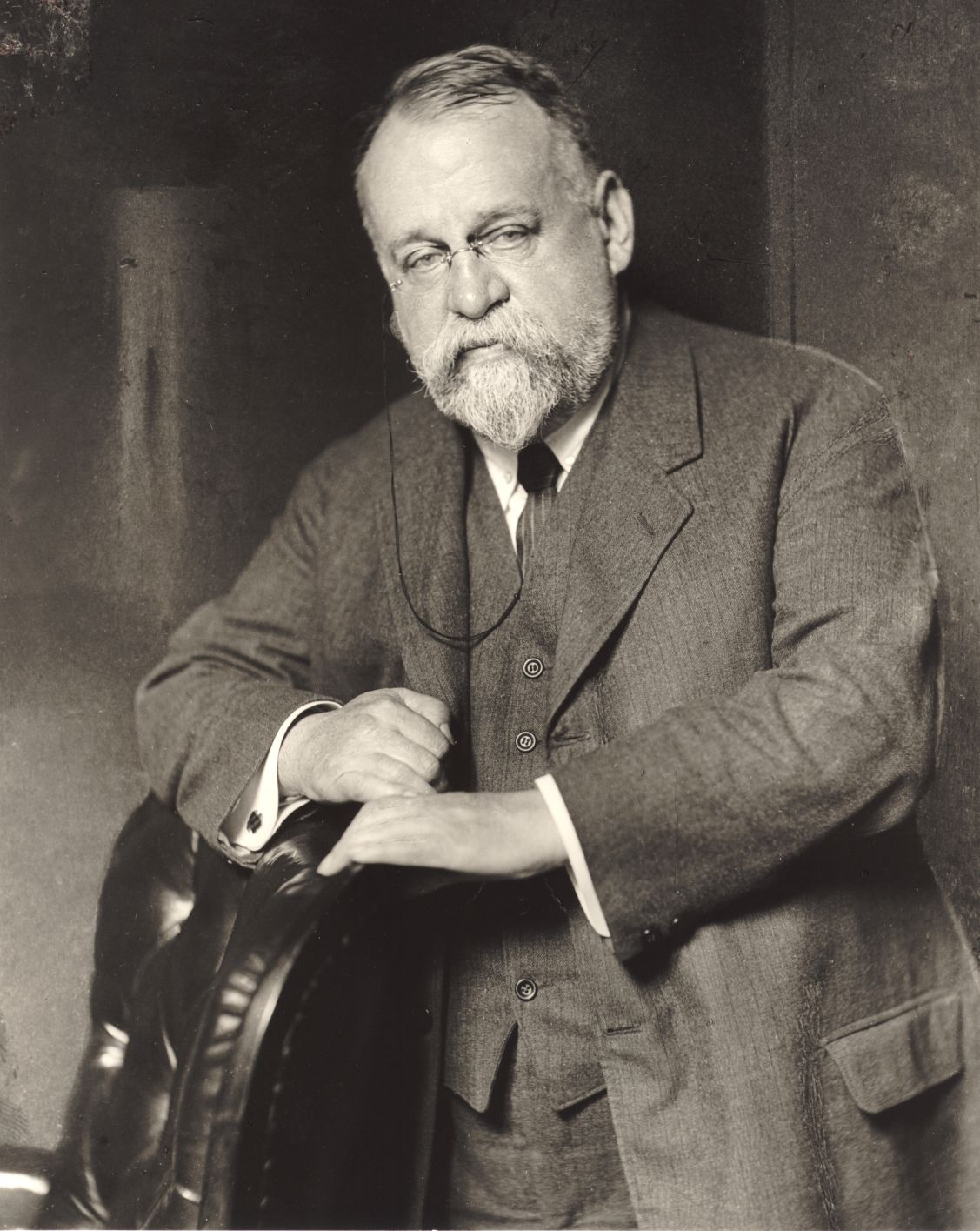
- Born: 29 July 1862; Jena, Germany
- Died: 20 May 1927 (aged 64); Vienna, Austria
- Spouse: Ernestine Brückner
- Father: Alexander Brückner

Academic background
- Education: Imperial University of Dorpat

Academic work
- Discipline: geography
- Sub-discipline: glaciology climatology
- Institutions: Deutsche Seewarte; University of Halle; University of Bern; University of Vienna
- Main interests: Alpine glaciers Brückner cycle
- Notable works: Die Alpen im Eiszeitalter

Eduard Brückner (29 July 1862 – 20 May 1927) was a geographer, glaciologist and climatologist.

== Biography ==
He was born in Jena, the son of the Baltic-German historian Alexander Brückner and Lucie Schiele. After an education at the Karlsruhe gymnasium, beginning in 1881 he studied meteorology and physics at the Imperial University of Dorpat, graduating in 1885. He joined the Deutsche Seewarte (German Hydrographic Office) in Hamburg, then, following studies at Dresden and Munich, he became a professor at the University of Bern in 1888. The same year he married Ernestine Steine. In 1899, he was rector at the university. He moved back to Germany in 1904, becoming a professor at the University of Halle. Two years later in 1906, he was a professor at the University of Vienna. He died in Vienna.

Professor Brückner was an expert on alpine glaciers and their effect upon the landscape. Between 1901 and 1909 he collaborated with German geographer and geologist Albrecht Penck to produce a three-volume work titled Die Alpen im Eiszeitalter (The Alps in the Ice Age). This served as a standard reference on the ice ages for several decades thereafter. Brückner was a proponent of the importance of climate change, including the effects on the economy and social structure of society. His research included studies of past climate changes and he proposed the 35-year-long Brückner cycle of cold, damp weather alternating with warm, dry weather in northwest Europe.

The GKSS Research Centre's Eduard Brückner Prize, for outstanding achievement in interdisciplinary climate research, is named after him.
