= Friherrefjella =

Mountain ridge in Spitsbergen, Norway

Coordinates: 77.439°N 15.855°E

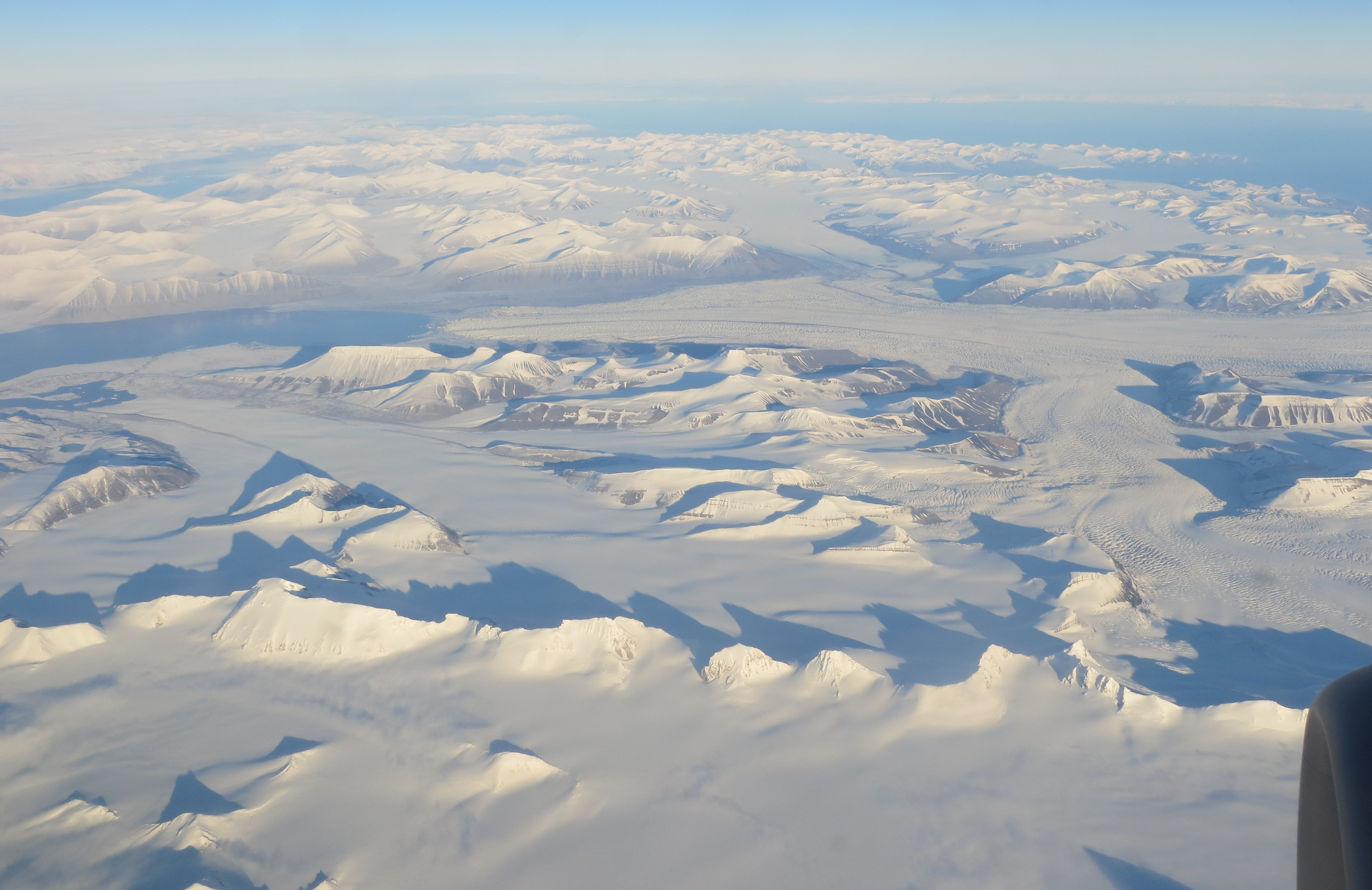

Friherrefjella is a mountain ridge in Wedel Jarlsberg Land at Spitsbergen, Svalbard. The ridge has a length of about 16 kilometers and a width of eight kilometers, and is situated between the Penckbreen and Nathorstbreen glacier complexes. Among the named mountains along the ridge are Neumayerberget (935 m.a.s.l.), Basilika (866 m.a.s.l.) and Basilikarabbane, Zillerberget, Sukkertoppen, Lappkota, Pagoden, Skiltoppen, Suessberget, Armfjellet, Aksla, Sotryggen and Valken.
