= Penckbreen =

Glacier in Svalbard, Norway

Coordinates: 77.46°N 15.64°E

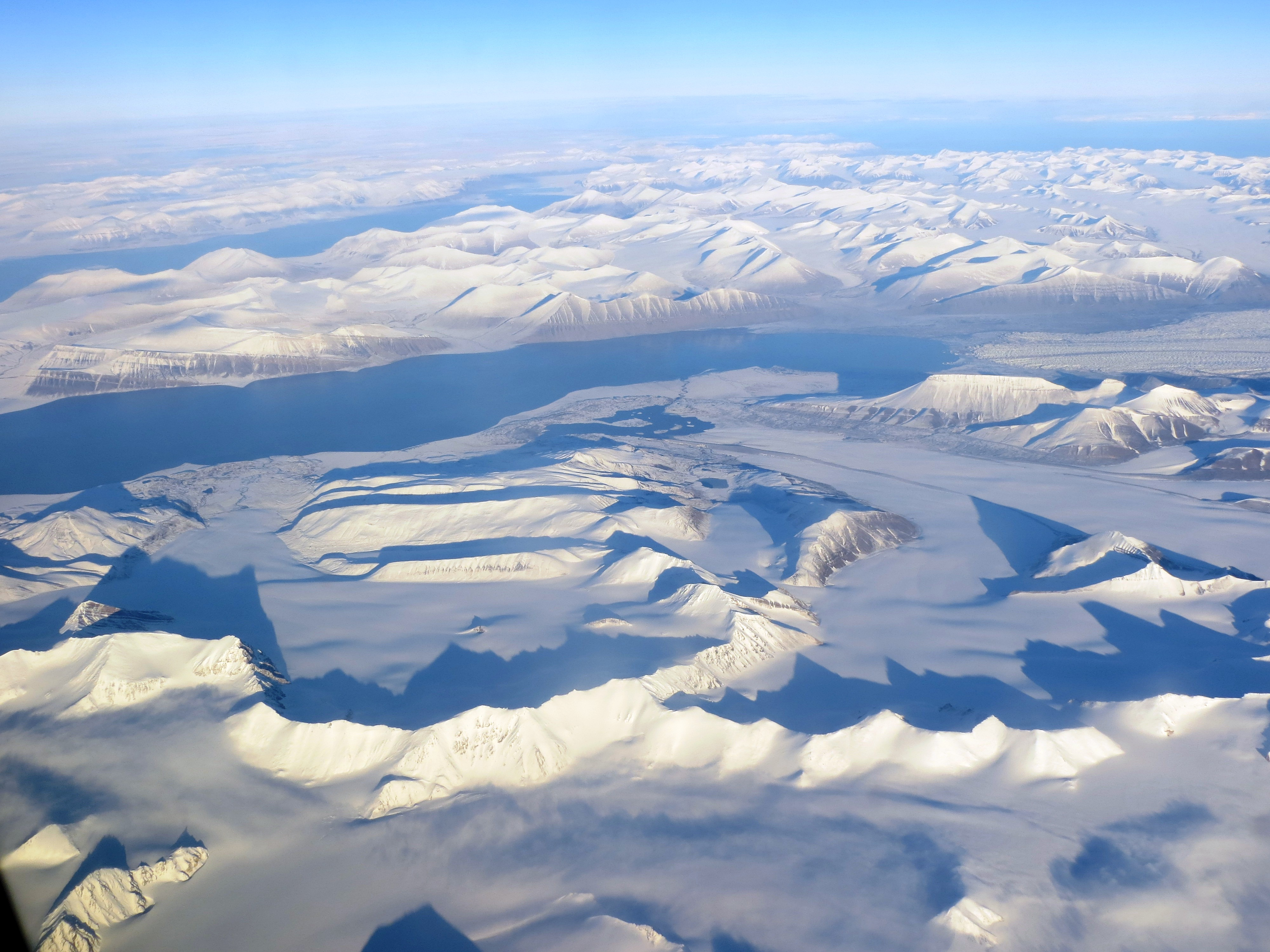
Aerial view from Wedel Jarlsberg Land, southwestern Spitsbergen, Norway

Penckbreen is a glacier in Wedel Jarlsberg Land at Spitsbergen, Svalbard. It is named after German geographer Albrecht Penck. The glacier has a length of about 22 kilometers, and is situated west of the mountain ridge of Friherrefjella. Tributary glaciers are Suessbreen, Tirolarbreen and Sveitsarfonna.
