= Alexander Brückner =

Baltic German historian (1834–1896)

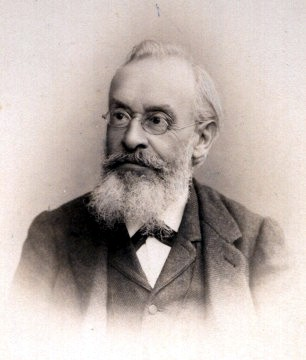
Alexander Bruckner

Alexander Brückner (5 August 1834, Saint Petersburg – 15 November 1896, Jena) was a Baltic German historian who specialized in Russian studies. He was the father of geographer Eduard Brückner.

He studied history and economics at the universities of Heidelberg, Jena and Berlin, receiving his doctorate in Heidelberg with a dissertation on the history of the Diet of Worms (1521). As a student, his instructors included Johann Gustav Droysen, Ludwig Häusser, Leopold von Ranke and Friedrich von Raumer. From 1861 to 1867 he served as a professor of history at the Imperial Law School in St. Petersburg, and afterwards was a professor of history at the University of Odessa (from 1867) and the Imperial University of Dorpat (1872–1891).

== Selected works ==
Bruckner was fluent in both German and Russian, and authored works in both languages. The following are a list of some of his German writings:

- Das Kupfergeld 1856-63 in Russland, 1863 – Copper money in Russia, 1856–63.
- Culturhistorische Studien, 1878 – Cultural history studies.
- Peter der Grosse, 1879 – Peter the Great.
- Katharina die Zweite, 1883 – Catherine the Great.
- Die Europäisierung Russlands Land und Volk, 1888 – The Europeanization of Russia's country and people.
- Geschichte Russlands bis zum Ende des 18 Jahrhunderts, (2 volumes, 1896–1913), with Constantin Mettig – History of Russia until the end of the 18th century.
