= Eugeniusz Romer =

Polish geographer, cartographer and geopolitician (1871–1954)

Eugeniusz Mikołaj Romer
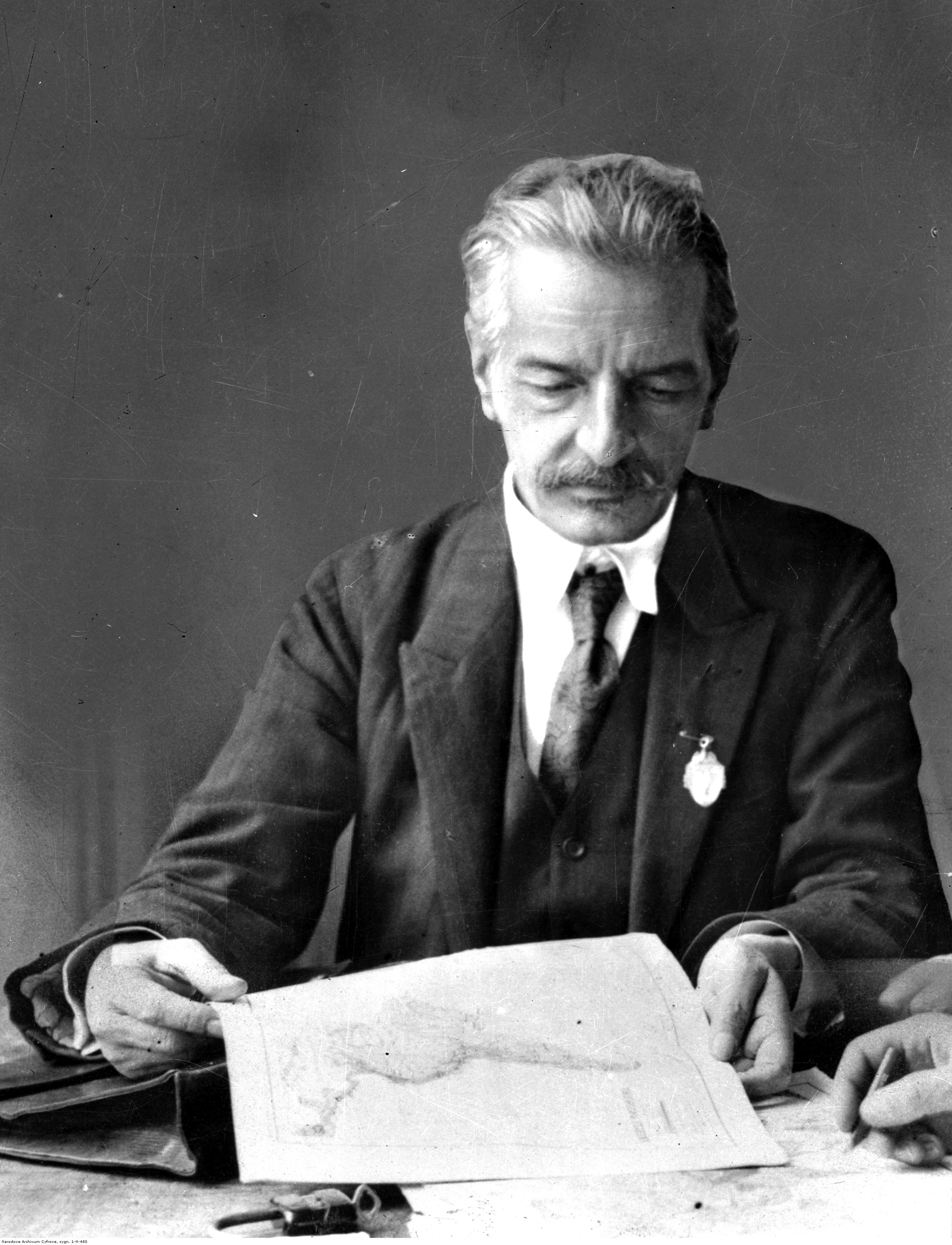
- Romer in 1928
- Born: 3 February 1871; Lwów
- Died: 28 January 1954 (aged 82); Kraków
- Occupations: geographer cartographer geopolitician
- Spouse: Jadwiga Rossknecht (since 1899)
- Children: Witold Romer (1900–1967); Edmund Romer (1904–1988)
- Relatives: Jan Romer (brother)

Eugeniusz Mikołaj Romer (3 February 1871 in Lviv (Polish: Lwów, German: Lemberg) – 28 January 1954) was a distinguished Polish geographer, cartographer and geopolitician, whose maps and atlases are still highly valued by experts.

== Life and career ==
Eugeniusz Romer was the son of Edmund Romer and Irena Kördvelessy de Asguth. He came from a noble family of German origins that had settled in Poland since the 15th century and had been the heirs of the village of Bieździedza since the late 16th century. Eugeniusz's grandfather, Henryk, lost the family estate due to his participation in the November Uprising. His son, Edmund, along with his brother Władysław, took part in the January Uprising. Later, as a graduate of Vienna's Theresianum and an Austrian official, he underwent partial Germanization and did not particularly cultivate Polish national traditions in his family home.

Eugeniusz Romer graduated from a high school in Nowy Sącz and studied history, geology, geography and meteorology at the Jagiellonian University in Kraków, also attending courses in Lwów and Halle (Saale). In 1894, Romer earned a doctorate in philosophy at University of Lviv. He was a president of Polish Copernicus Society of Naturalists (1910–11).

In final years of the 19th century, he went to Vienna and Berlin to broaden his knowledge of glaciology, geology and meteorology. Romer also went to Lausanne, to study tectonics and morphology. In 1911 he became professor of Lwów University (in 1946 also of Jagiellonian University), later he was named professor honoris causa at the universities in Lwów, Poznań and Kraków. In 1952 he became a member of Polish Academy of Sciences

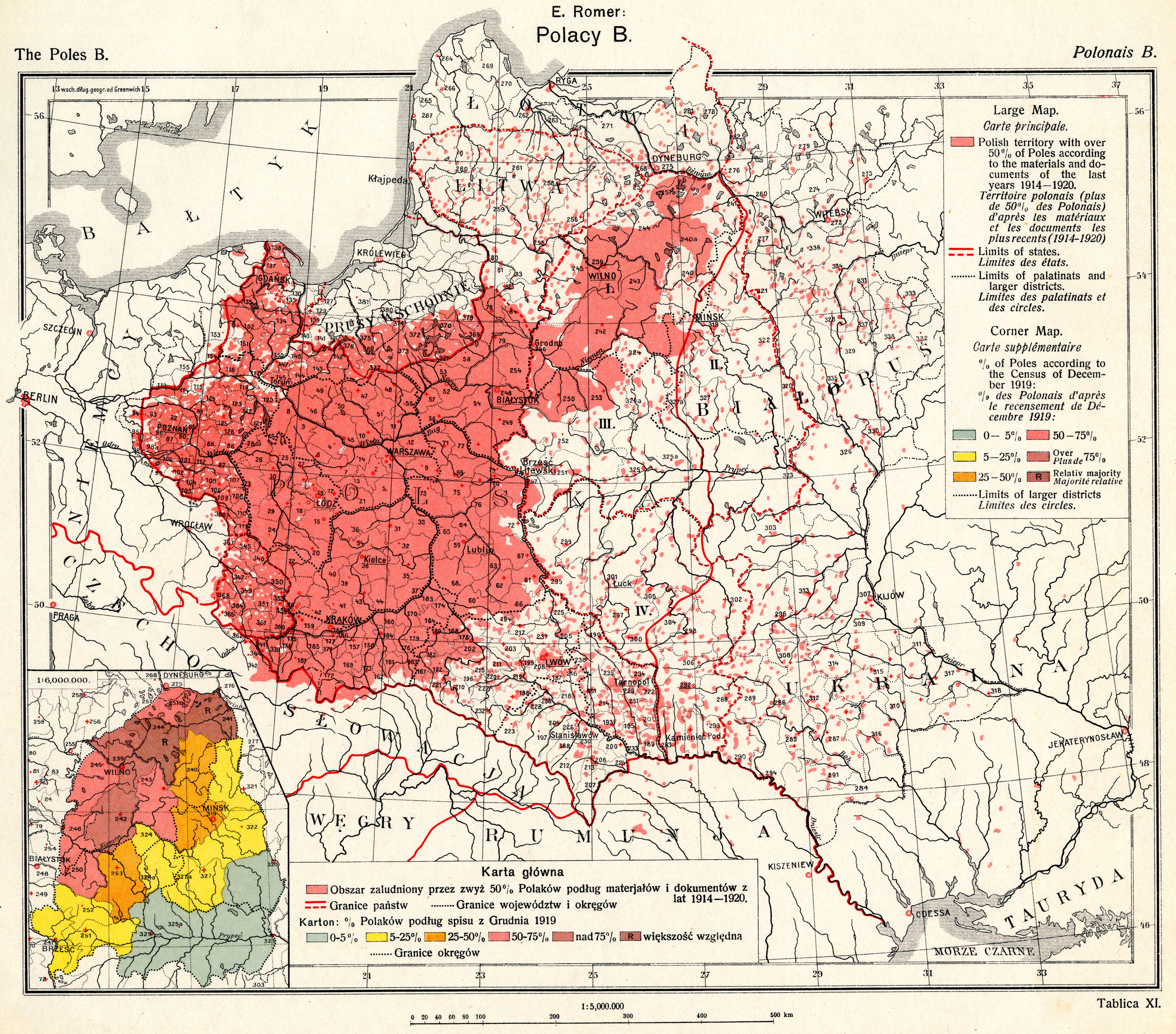
Plate XI from the 1921 edition of Romer's Atlas, showing the distribution of Poles

In 1909 Romer went to Switzerland, to study Alpine glaciers. Next year, he traveled to Asia, and in 1913 to Alaska, to the Saint Elias Mountains (where one of glaciers has been named after him). In 1916, while in Vienna, Romer started work on the Great Statistical and Geographical Atlas of Poland. This atlas, published in Vienna in 1916, was crucial to establishing borders of the Second Polish Republic. He was a member of the Polish delegation at the Paris Peace Conference, 1919, helping to draw the western border of Poland. His Ukrainian rival, and the father of Ukrainian geography, Stepan Rudnytsky, was a fellow student of Albrecht Penck in Vienna. The second edition of his atlas was published in Lwów and Warsaw in 1921.

In 1921 in Lwów Romer founded Cartographical Institute. In 1921-24 he led to a merger of two publishing companies Książnica and Atlas into Ksiaznica-Atlas, which was moved to Wrocław after World War II. It still exists today. In 1929 he retired, concentrating his activities on the institute. However, he kept close ties with Lwów's Jan Kazimierz University, lecturing and examining.

In 1941, when Lwów was captured by the Germans, he hid in a monastery at Piekarska Street, and this decision probably saved his life. Soon after, the Home Army decided to move him to Warsaw, from where he was to be transferred to England to work as an advisor of the Polish government-in-exile. However, doctors recommended that Romer should stay in the occupied country, as the journey was too risky for his weak health. Thus, he remained in Warsaw, using the false name Edmund Piotrowski. Romer survived the Warsaw Uprising and a camp in Pruszków.

After the war, he settled in Kraków, taking the post of director of Department of Geography at the Jagiellonian University. Since 1899, he had been married to Jadwiga Rossknecht, daughter of co-owner of the Okocim Brewery. They had two sons: Witold Romer (1900–1967), professor of the Wrocław University of Technology and Edmund Romer (1904–1988), professor of the Silesian University of Technology in Gliwice.

Eugeniusz Romer died 1954 in Kraków and was buried at the Salwator Cemetery.

== Sources ==
- http://www.lwow.home.pl/semper/romer.html
- http://www.pgi.gov.pl/muzeum/poczet/Eugeniusz_Romer/eugeniusz_romer.html
- http://portalwiedzy.onet.pl/63522,,,,romer_eugeniusz,haslo.html
