= Albrecht Penck =

German geologist and geographer

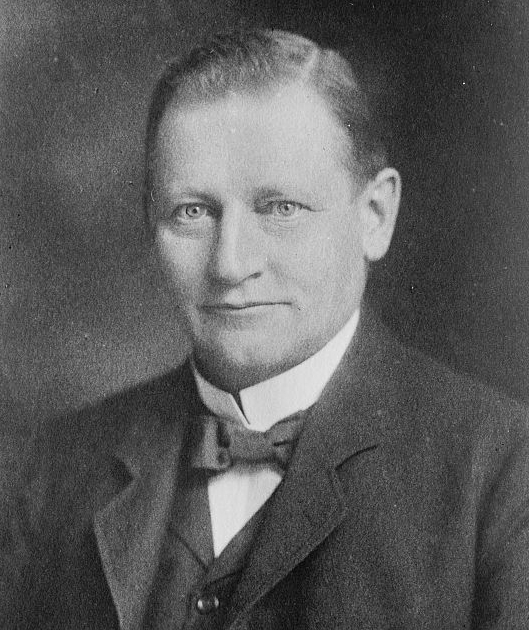
- Penck in 1911
- Born: 25 September 1858; Reudnitz, Kingdom of Saxony
- Died: 7 March 1945 (aged 86); Prague, Bohemia and Moravia, Nazi Germany
- Education: University of Leipzig
- Awards: Charles P. Daly Medal (1914); Vega Medal (1923)
- Scientific career
- Fields: Geomorphology, Quaternary geology, climatology, political geography
- Workplaces: University of Vienna; Harvard University; Humboldt University
- Doctoral advisor: Ferdinand Zirkel
- Doctoral students: Jovan Cvijić, Johann Sölch, Eduard Brückner, Alfred Merz, Naomasa Yamasaki

Albrecht Penck (25 September 1858 – 7 March 1945) was a German geographer and geologist and the father of Walther Penck.

== Biography ==
Born in Reudnitz near Leipzig, Penck became a university professor in Vienna, Austria, from 1885 to 1906, and in Berlin from 1906 to 1927. There he was also the director of the Institute and Museum for Oceanography by 1918. He dedicated himself to geomorphology and climatology, and he raised the international profile of the Vienna school of physical geography.

With Eduard Brückner, he coauthored Die Alpen im Eiszeitalter, a work in which the two scientists identified the four ice ages of the European Pleistocene (Gunz, Mindel, Riss, Würm); these being named after the river valleys that were the first indication of each glaciation.

In 1886, he married Ida the sister of the successful Bavarian regional writer Ludwig Ganghofer.

In Vienna, he taught the Polish geographer Eugeniusz Romer and Ukrainian geographer Stepan Rudnytsky, who led the ethnographic efforts at the Paris Peace Conference (1919–1920).

Penck arranged for the posthumous publication of his son's work Der Morphologische Analyse in 1924. However he did not take any stance for or against his son's theories on geomorphology.

In 1928, Penck taught as a visiting professor at the University of California at Berkeley led by Carl O. Sauer.

Albrecht Penck was elected a member of the Royal Swedish Academy of Sciences in 1905, elected an International Member of the American Philosophical Society in 1908, elected an International Member of the United States National Academy of Sciences in 1909, and awarded the Founder's Medal of the Royal Geographical Society in 1914.

In 1945, Penck died in Prague.

== Legacy ==
The glacier of Penckbreen in Wedel Jarlsberg Land at Spitsbergen, Svalbard is named after him. Since 1958 the "Albrecht-Penck-Medaille" is awarded by the Deutsche Quartärvereinigung for accomplishments associated with Quaternary science.

In memory of Penck, the painter and sculptor Ralf Winkler adopted the nom de plume A. R. Penck in 1966.

== Criticism; political geography ==
While Penck's physical geography is highly regarded, his forays into political geography after 1914 have been criticized. During World War I he supported German expansionism, helping to develop the existing concept of Lebensraum (living space: territory necessary for a nation state, specifically for its prosperity and security). This led the American geographer Davis to write: "He used to be liked as much as admired, but during the war some of his statements have lessened the esteem formerly felt for him: into that matter we do not enter farther here". After World War I Penck continued to develop and promote Lebensraum concepts. This thinking was seized upon by German nationalism of the period. For instance, the annexation by Germany of the Reichsgau Wartheland after the 1939 invasion of Poland was justified using Penck's concept of kulturboden (or "German soil").

== Works ==
- Morphologie der Erdoberfläche; 2 vols, 1894
- (with Eduard Bruckner) Die Alpen im Eiszeitalter; 3 vols, 1909
- Die Gipfelflur der Alpen (1919)
- With geographer Eduard Richter, he was editor of the Atlas der Österreichischen Alpenseen (Atlas of the Austrian Alpine Lakes, 1895).
- International Map of the World
