= Polyconic projection class =

Class of map projections

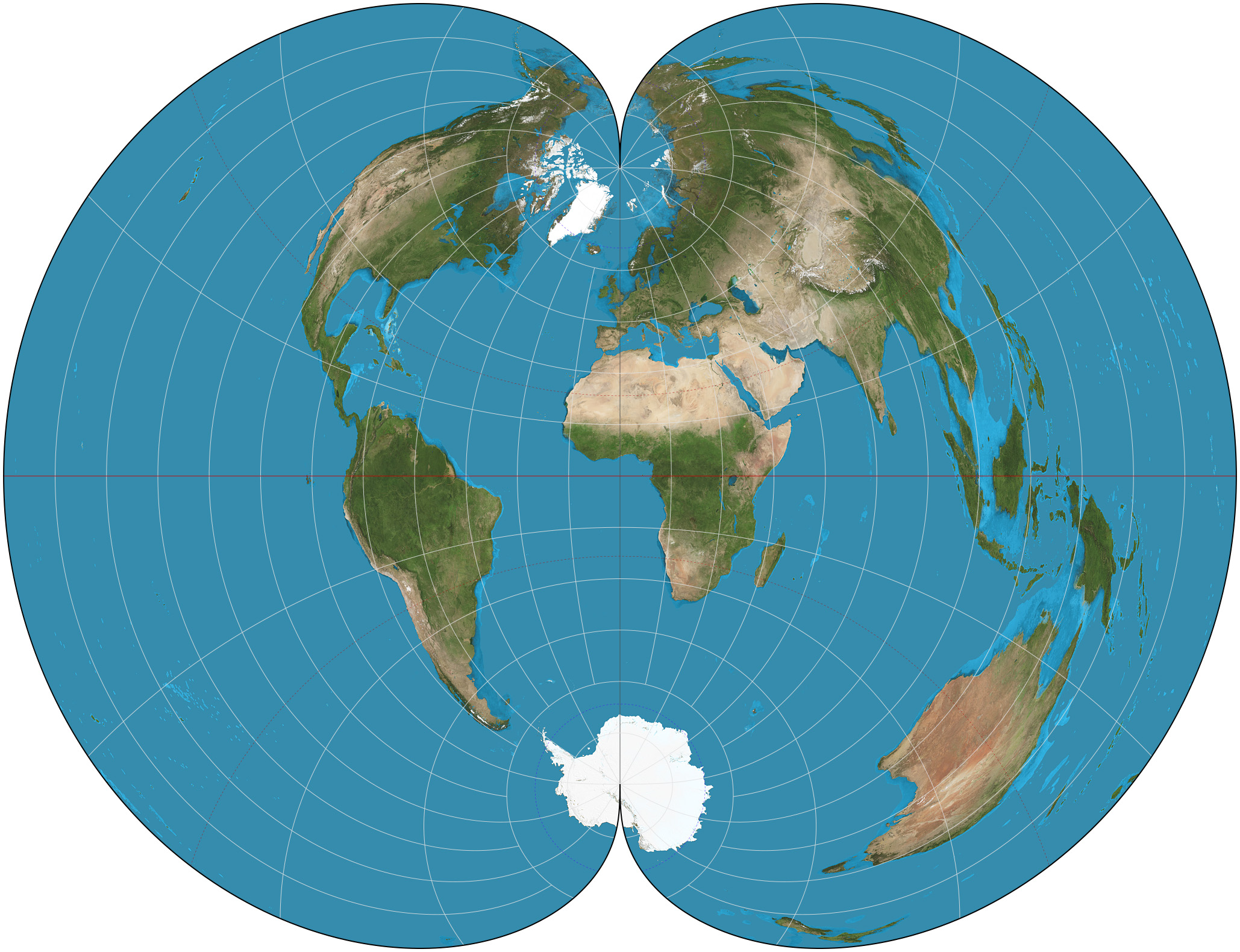
American polyconic projection of the world

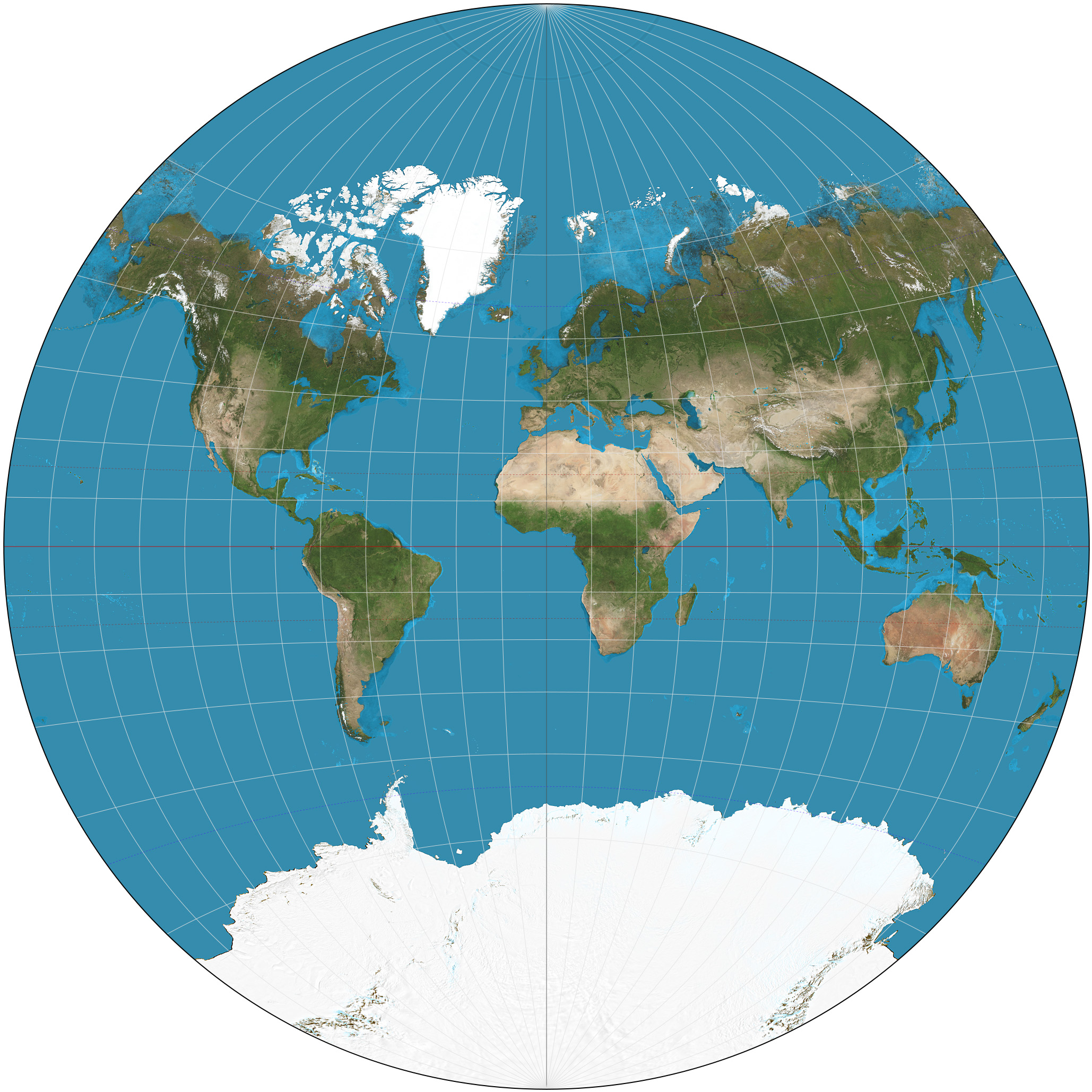
Van der Grinten projection of the world.

Polyconic can refer either to a class of map projections or to a specific projection known less ambiguously as the American polyconic projection. Polyconic as a class refers to those projections whose parallels are all non-concentric circular arcs, except for a straight equator, and the centers of these circles lie along a central axis. This description applies to projections in equatorial aspect.

== Polyconic projections ==
Some of the projections that fall into the polyconic class are:

- American polyconic projection—each parallel becomes a circular arc having true scale, the same scale as the central meridian
- Latitudinally equal-differential polyconic projection
- Rectangular polyconic projection
- Van der Grinten projection—projects entire earth into one circle; all meridians and parallels are arcs of circles.
- Nicolosi globular projection—typically used to project a hemisphere into a circle; all meridians and parallels are arcs of circles.

A series of polyconic projections, each in a circle, was also presented by Hans Mauer in 1922, who also presented an equal-area polyconic in 1935. Another series by Georgiy Aleksandrovich Ginzburg appeared starting in 1949.

Most polyconic projections, when used to map the entire sphere, produce an "apple-shaped" map of the world. There are many "apple-shaped" projections, almost all of them obscure.

== See also ==
- List of map projections
