= American polyconic projection =

Map projection historically used for maps of the United States

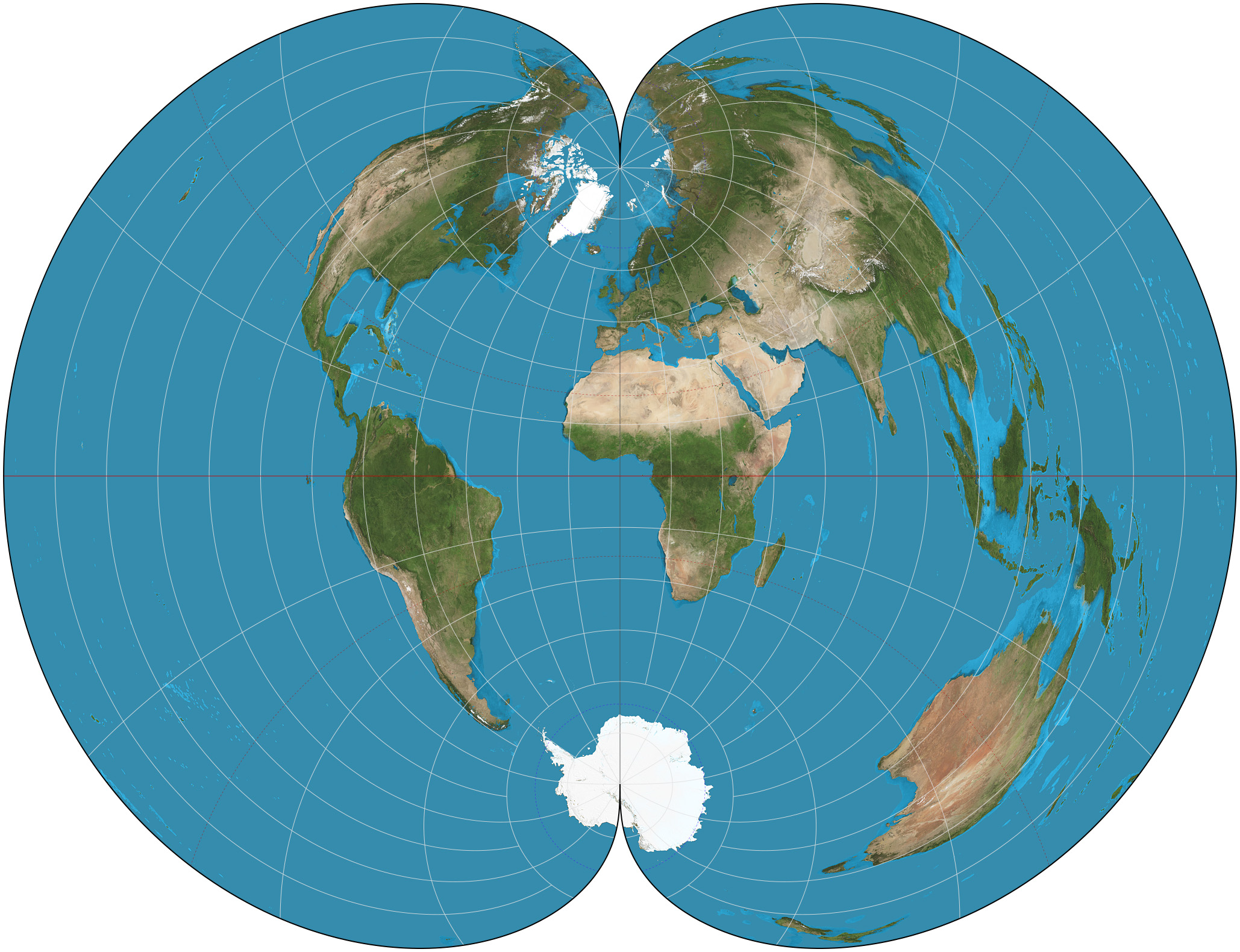
American polyconic projection of the world

American polyconic projection with Tissot's indicatrix of deformation

In the cartography of the United States, the American polyconic projection is a map projection used for maps of the United States and its regions beginning early in the 19th century. It belongs to the polyconic projection class, which consists of map projections whose parallels are non-concentric circular arcs except for the equator, which is straight. Often the American polyconic is simply called the polyconic projection.

The American polyconic projection was probably invented by Swiss-American cartographer Ferdinand Rudolph Hassler around 1825. It was commonly used by many map-making agencies of the United States from the time of its proposal until the middle of the 20th century. It is not used much these days, having been replaced by conformal projections in the State Plane Coordinate System.

== Description ==
The American polyconic projection can be thought of as "rolling" a cone tangent to the Earth at all parallels of latitude. This generalizes the concept of a conic projection, which uses a single cone to project the globe onto. By using this continuously varying cone, each parallel becomes a circular arc having true scale, contrasting with a conic projection, which can only have one or two parallels at true scale. The scale is also true on the central meridian of the projection.

The projection is defined by:

$$\begin{align}x &= \cot \varphi \sin \! \bigl([\lambda - \lambda_0]\sin \varphi\bigr) \\
y &= \varphi - \varphi_0 + \cot \varphi  \,\Bigl(1 - \cos\bigl([\lambda - \lambda_0]\sin \varphi\bigr)\Bigr)
\end{align}$$

where:

- λ is the longitude of the point to be projected;
- φ is the latitude of the point to be projected;
- λ_{0} is the longitude of the central meridian;
- φ_{0} is the latitude chosen to be the origin at λ_{0}.

To avoid division by zero, the formulas above are extended so that if φ = 0, then x = λ − λ_{0} and y = −φ_{0}.

== See also ==
- List of map projections
