= German Maritime Observatory =

Meteorology institution in Hamburg, 1875–1945

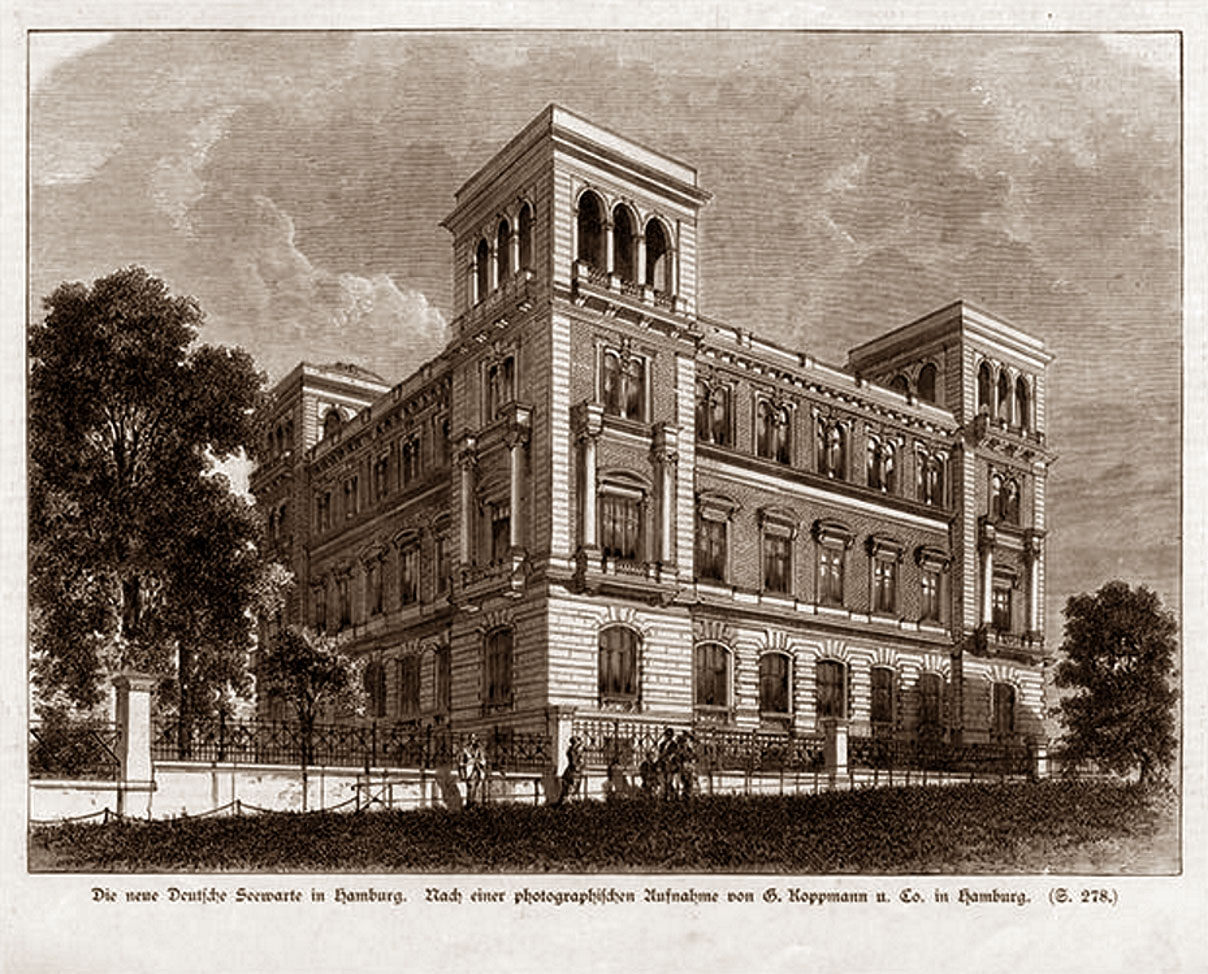
The Deutsche Seewarte building in Hamburg in 1881

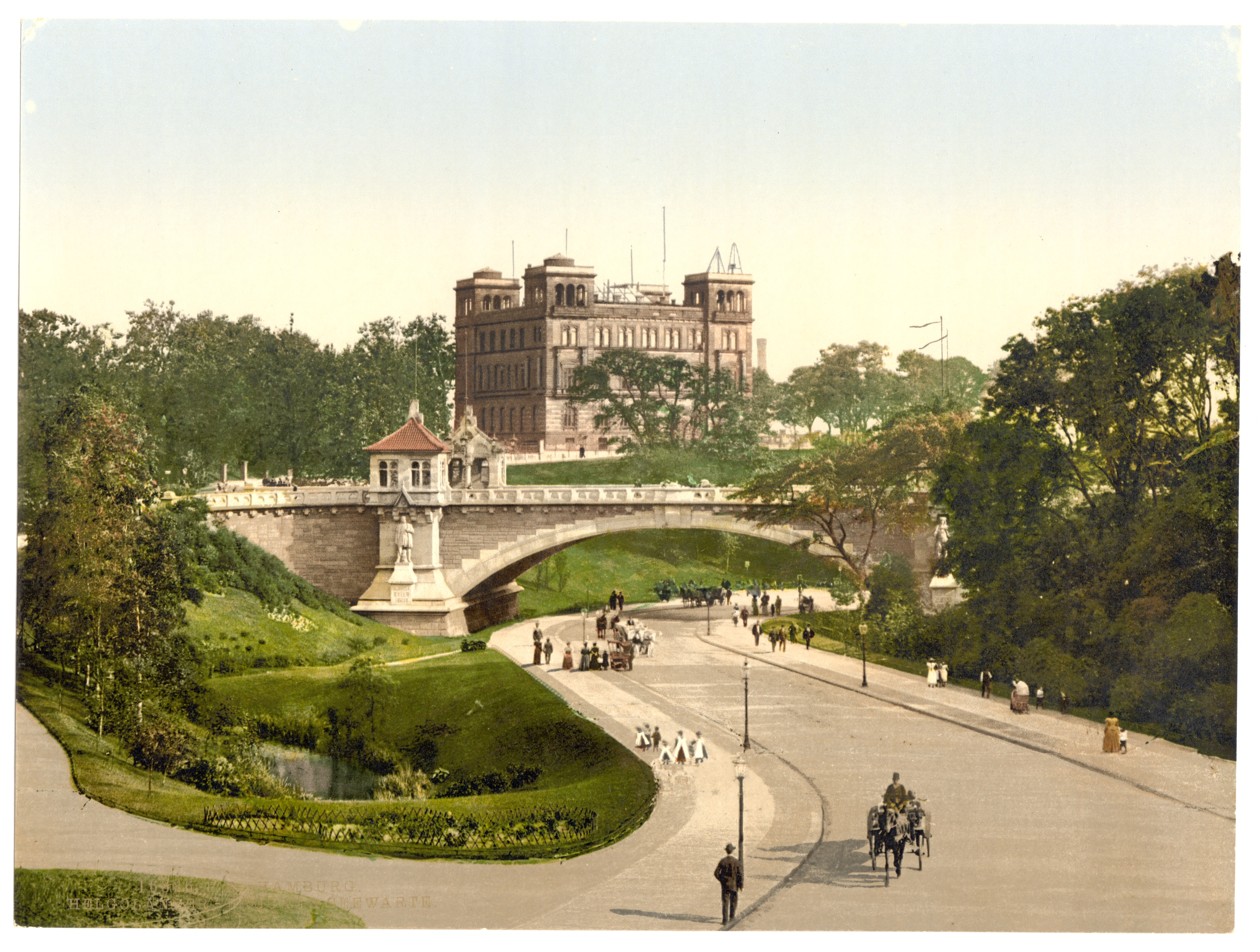
View of the building behind the Kersten Miles Bridge, between 1890 and 1900

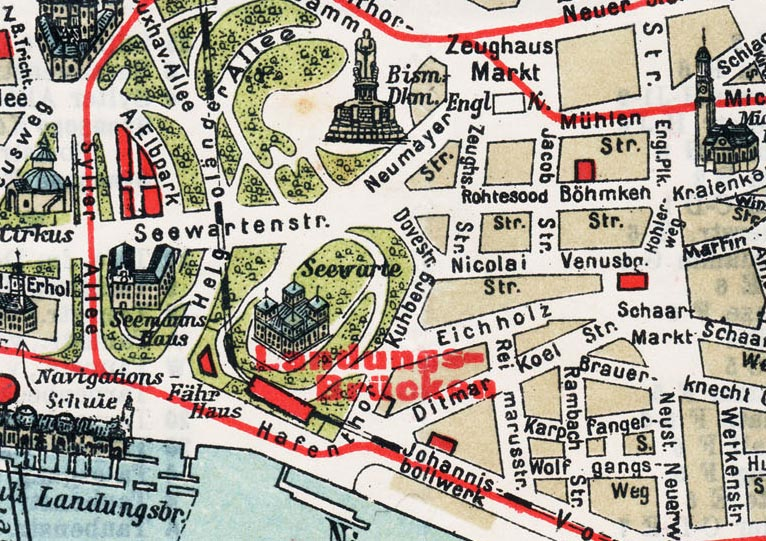
1913 map showing the location of the Seewarte building

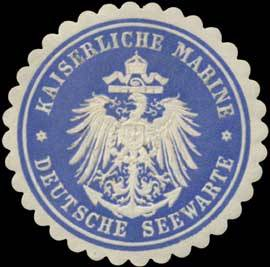
Official seal of the Deutsche Seewarte

The German Maritime Observatory (German: Deutsche Seewarte) was the principal institution for the advancement of maritime meteorology in Germany from 1875 to 1945. Its headquarters were located in Hamburg.

The German Naval Observatory was replaced by the Federal Maritime and Hydrographic Agency and the German Meteorological Service.

== History ==
In 1867, Wilhelm von Freeden founded the private North German Naval Observatory (German: Norddeutsche Seewarte) in Hamburg. The purpose of the institution was to promote and facilitate maritime intercourse. It comprised the department of maritime meteorology; a bureau of nautical, meteorological, and magnetic instruments; the department of coast meteorology and signal service; and a bureau for testing chronometers. It was dissolved in February 1875, and its responsibilities taken over by the state-run German Maritime Observatory.

In 1874, the German Federal Council passed a decree establishing the Deutsche Seewarte as an Imperial Institution. The decree came into force on January 1, 1875, and the Observatory came under the authority of the Imperial Admiralty. Its first director was Georg von Neumayer, who served from 1875 to 1903 and had previously been involved with the North German Naval Observatory.

The aims of the Observatory were stated in its first Annual Report as follows:

The investigation of the physical conditions of all seas touched by international trade and the atmosphere above them, and the practical application of the results obtained thereby, is essential for the development, promotion, and safety of that trade. In order for this fundamental idea to be fruitfully applied, the merchant navy, to which global maritime trade is primarily entrusted, requires, in order to fulfill its task, a scientific institution capable of dedicating itself entirely to its needs with regard to literature, working methods, and instruments of navigation. We possess such an institution in the German Naval Observatory, whose aims are broadly outlined by the preceding words.

The headquarters of the German Naval Observatory were located in Hamburg, initially in the former Seamens' Hospital. A new building was built on the Stintfang according to plans by the architects Gustav Jacob Kirchenpauer and Ludwig Hermann Philippi and, after two years of construction, was inaugurated on September 14, 1881, in the presence of Emperor Wilhelm I. The construction costs amounted to 450,000 Reichsmarks.

From 1919, the German Naval Observatory was placed under the authority of the Reich Ministry of Transport. Of great importance for the German Naval Observatory, whose reputation had declined somewhat over the years, was the assumption of the presidency by Vice Admiral (ret.) Hugo Dominik in September 1926. Dominik primarily initiated the unification of aerology and oceanography and was generally very active in reform, as well as playing a key role in organizing the Second International Polar Year in 1933. He headed the German Naval Observatory until his death in September 1933. From 1934, the Observatory was again subordinate to the High Command of the Navy.

In April 1945, the building on the Stintfang was destroyed by wartime action. After 1945, the tasks of the German Naval Observatory were divided: The hydrographic section was assigned to the German Hydrographic Institute (DHI, 1945–1990) and its successor, the Federal Maritime and Hydrographic Agency (BSH); both also based in Hamburg. In the GDR, these tasks were taken over by the GDR Hydrographic Service from 1950 until 1990. The meteorological tasks were initially assigned to the Meteorological Office for Northwest Germany (MANWD), which was integrated into the newly founded German Weather Service (DWD) on January 1, 1953.

The site of the former Maritime Observatory building is now occupied by a hostel of the German Youth Hostel Association.

== Organization and tasks ==
The German Naval Observatory primarily pursued the promotion and safety of maritime traffic. It consisted of four departments:

=== Maritime meteorology and Oceanography ===
The first department dealt with maritime meteorology, collected observations on the physical conditions of the sea and on meteorological phenomena on the high seas, distributed the meteorological ship's journals (weather books), which were laid out according to a common international scheme, to the ship's captains who wanted to contact the naval observatory, gave instructions on the correct keeping of these weather books and collected and discussed them for the purpose of drawing up general and special sailing instructions as well as the travel routes to be taken.

=== Instrument procurement and testing ===
The second department was responsible for procuring and testing nautical, meteorological, and magnetic instruments and apparatus. It tested sextants, octants, and ship's compasses, dealt with the practical application of the theory of magnetism in navigation, and managed the collection of models and instruments, which was primarily intended to explain new inventions in the field of navigation and to instruct the nautical public.

=== Weather telegraphy and storm warnings ===
The third department was responsible for coastal meteorology and storm warnings in Germany. Since 1906 (under department head Wilhelm Jacob van Bebber), its main tasks consisted of the daily collection of telegraphic weather reports, the subsequent daily reporting (largely also via telegraph), and the creation of forecasts. This was immediately followed by the drafting, production, and distribution of " harbor telegrams", weather reports, and weather maps to newspapers, government agencies, and private subscribers.

=== Chronometer Testing Institute ===
The fourth department of the Naval Observatory, the Chronometer Testing Institute, was established slightly later. It promoted the interests of the German chronometer industry and determined the rate of the chronometers submitted to it for observation and testing by the German merchant navy at various temperatures. Competitive chronometer tests were also held from time to time, in which the suppliers of the best chronometers were offered significantly higher prices than the usual purchase prices. The first such competition occurred in 1877.

=== Branch offices, sub-offices and overseas stations ===
In order to solve the tasks assigned to the German Naval Observatory with regard to coastal meteorology, it needed, in addition to the central office in Hamburg, a number of branch offices, agencies (main and subsidiary agencies), normal observation stations and signal stations.

The agencies were to examine the various nautical and meteorological instruments, conduct investigations into deviation (the deviation of compasses on board iron ships), and give advice to shipmasters regarding shipping lanes, important works and maps, and everything related to keeping meteorological ship logs.

The observations that provided the third department of the Naval Observatory with some of the material for its investigations and publications (storm warnings, etc.) were made at the new normal observation stations, which were built in Memel, Neufahrwasser, Swinemünde, Cuxhaven, Kiel, Hamburg, Keitum on Sylt, Wilhelmshaven (Imperial Observatory) and Borkum and were equipped not only with the usual meteorological instruments but also with self - recording barometers and anemometers, and in some cases also with recording thermometers. Furthermore, regular observations were made at specific times, just like at any ordinary meteorological station. The signal stations disseminated weather reports and storm warnings issued by the naval observatory to the public without delay.

Throughout its history, the German Naval Observatory operated more than 1,500 overseas stations in numerous regions of the world. A particularly large number of weather stations were operated in the former German colonial territories between 1884 and 1914. The stations were established or taken over from the main office in Hamburg and equipped with standardized, calibrated measuring instruments.

== Publications ==
A large part of the work of the Naval Observatory was published in the Annals of Hydrography and Maritime Meteorology (German: Annalen der Hydrographie und Maritimen Meteorologie), published by the hydrographic office of the Imperial Navy.

The Directorate of the Maritime Observatory also issued the following summaries:

- Daily weather reports and weather maps
- Monthly overviews of the weather in Northern and Central Europe
- Meteorological observations in Germany from 25 secondary stations, as well as hourly records from three standard observation stations of the German Naval Observatory and Kaiserslautern, as well as the storms reports from to the signal stations of the German Naval Observatory
- The Nautical Yearbook

A complete collection of the work of the Maritime Observatory since 1878 has been published in the series: Aus dem Archiv der Deutschen Seewarte (From the archives of the German Maritime Observatory). This collection also includes independent reports and publications by staff of the Naval Observatory on various fields of nautical and meteorological science.

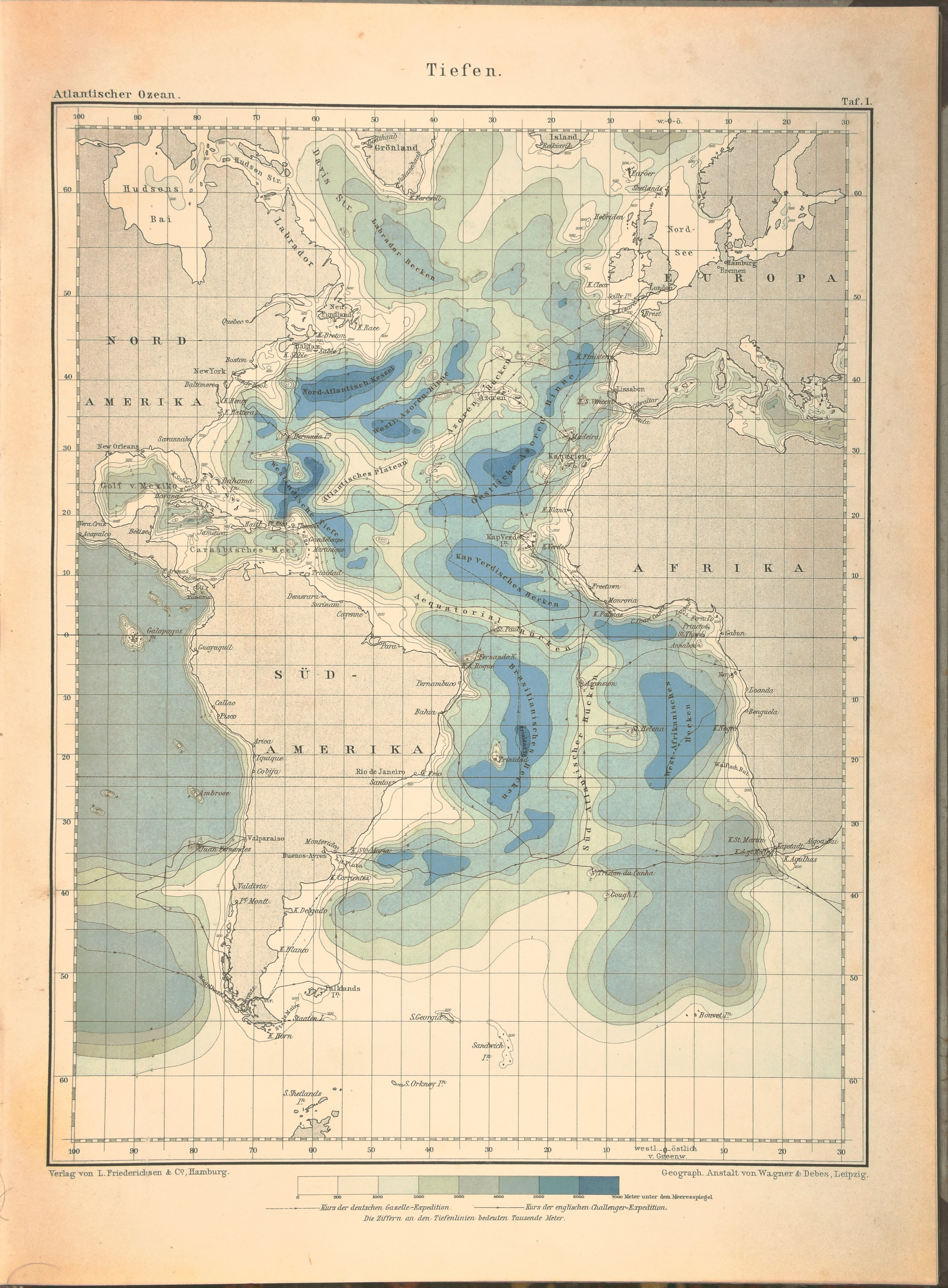
Depth chart of the Atlantic, Plate 1 from the Atlas of 36 charts

The Observatory also published a series of sailing handbooks and pilot books. The first of these, the Segelhandbuch für den atlantischen Ozean. Mit einem Atlas von 36 Karten (Sailing handbook for the Atlantic Ocean. With an atlas of 36 charts.), appeared in 1885 though the Atlas had been published earlier, in 1882. The information in the handbook and atlas was valued as being comprehensive and up-to-date. Neumayer was a great admirer of the U.S. oceanographer Matthew Fontaine Maury, and frequently cited his work. Maury's influence is clear both in the methods of collection of data and in the organisation of the material. The charts in the Atlas display information on ocean depths, temperatures, currents, salinity, barometric pressure, winds, storm frequencies, rainfall, magnetism, shipping routes, and hunting grounds for whales. In 1891 an Atlas of the Indian Ocean was published, followed by a sailing handbook in 1892, and in 1896, an Altas of the Pacific Ocean, followed by a sailing handbook in 1897.

== Trivia ==
Two modern streets, Seewartenstraße and Neumayerstraße are near the former site of the Maritime Observatory.

On January 21, 2018, a message in a bottle was found in Australia. It had been thrown into the Indian Ocean on June 12, 1886, by the German barque "Paula" on behalf of the Maritime Observatory. With over 131 years before discovery, this makes it the oldest known message in a bottle in the world.

== Directors ==
- Georg von Neumayer: from its founding in January 1875 to 1903
- Rear Admiral (ret.) Alfred Herz: from 1903 to October 1911
- Rear Admiral Karl Behm: from October 1911 to February 1919
- Privy Councillor/Senior Government Councillor Hans Capelle: 1919/1920, former head of the Hydrographic Office

== Presidents ==
- Vice Admiral (ret.) Hugo Dominik: from September 1926 to September 1933 (†)
- Rear Admiral (ret.) Fritz Spieß: from 1934 until the end of the war
