= Stepan Rudnytsky =

Ukrainian geographer & ethnographer (1877–1937)

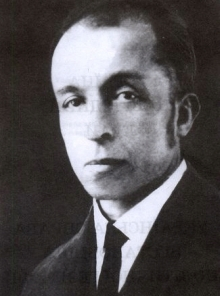
- Portrait of Stepan Rudnytsky
- Born: November 3, 1877
- Died: October 9, 1937 (aged 59)
- Occupations: Director of the Ukrainian Scientific Research Institute of Geography and Cartography
- Years active: 1908 - 1933

Stepan Rudnytsky (Ukrainian: Степан Рудницький; 3 December 1877 - 3 November 1937) was a Ukrainian geographer, professor in the Kharkiv Institute of People's Education, and director of the Ukrainian Scientific Research Institute of Geography and Cartography. He is notable for his work in defining the geology of Ukraine.

== Life ==
Stepan Rudnytsky was born on 3 December 1877, in Peremyshl, Galicia (now Przemyśl, Poland). Rudnytsky's mother encouraged him to learn both German and Ukrainian. From 1895 to 1899, he pursued education at Lviv University, studying history, geography, geology, paleontology, and the German and Ukrainian languages and literatures. After becoming qualified to teach high school in 1899, he continued his education in the University of Vienna from 1899 to 1901, studying under geographer Albrecht Penck. After completing his studies, Rudnytsky taught at a secondary school in Ternopil between 1902 and 1908. In 1908, he habilitated his doctorate. He later lectured at Lviv University as a university docent, and during this period, he authored the two-volume book named “A Short Geography of Ukraine” published in 1910 and 1914. He later also became a professor at the Ukrainian Free University and the Ukrainian Higher Pedagogical Institute in Prague, and was director of the Cartographic Institute in Kharkiv.

=== Career ===
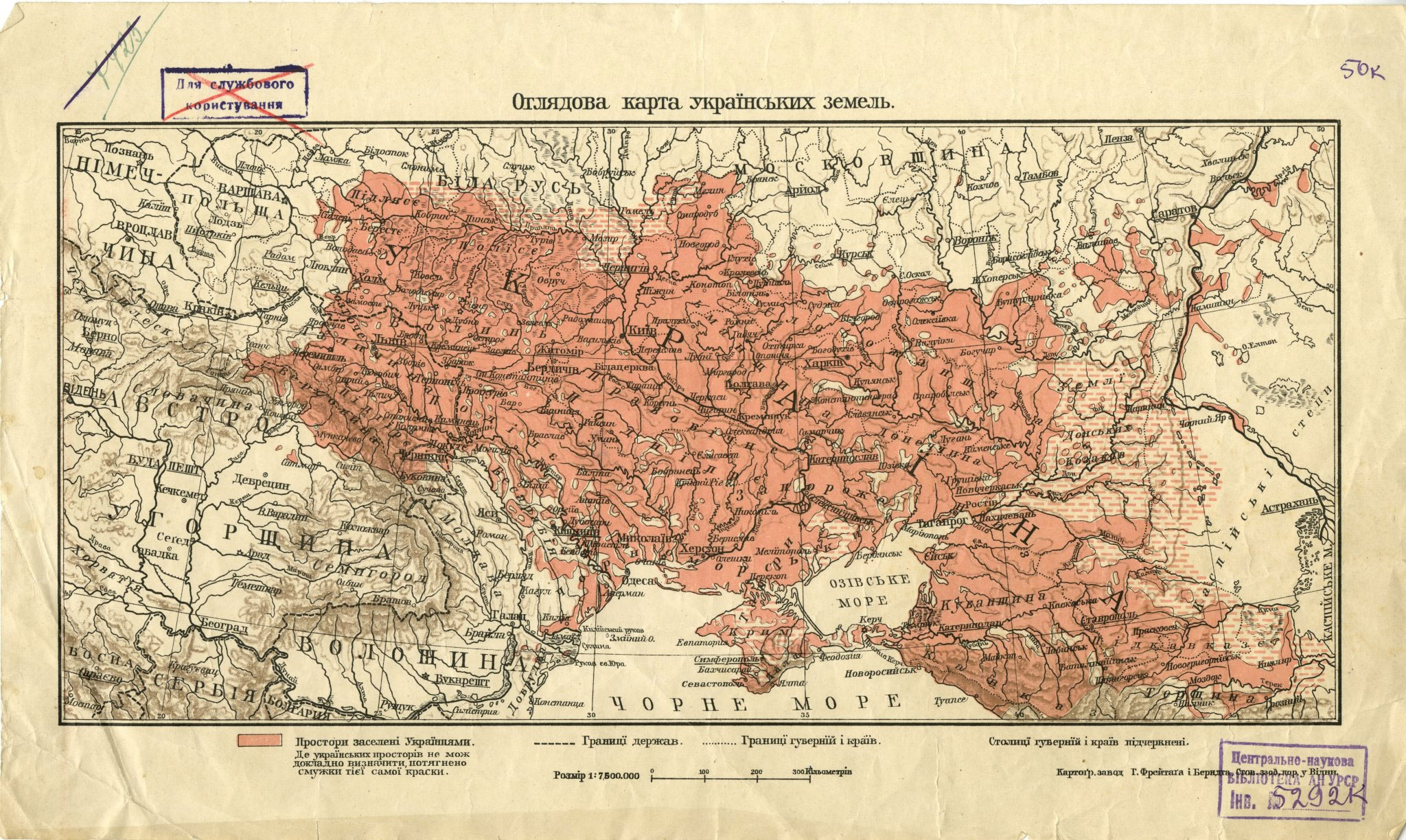
A map of Ukraine, prepared by Rudnytsky in 1915.

Stepan Rudnytsky developed Ukrainian geographical terminology and published the first specialized dictionary in the field in 1908 as a university professor in Ukrainian geology. During World War I, he lived in Vienna being active in the Union for the Liberation of Ukraine. In 1918, he prepared the first wall maps of Ukraine's physical geography. In 1926, Rudnytsky was invited by the Ukrainian government to organize geological research in Kharkiv, and became a professor in the Kharkiv Institute of People's Education, and also as the director of the Ukrainian Scientific Research Institute of Geography and Cartography.

During his lifetime he became a full member of the Shevchenko Scientific Society (NTSh), the All-Ukrainian Academy of Sciences (VUAN), and a corresponding member of both the Vienna Academy of Sciences and the Royal Geographical Society in London.

=== Political persecution and death ===
On 3 September 1933, Rudnytsky was arrested by the DPU of the Ukrainian SSR, accused of being a member in the counter-revolutionary organization, sabotage, and espionage. He was sentenced to five years in “Svirlag” camps (Vepsland) and the Solovetsky Special Purpose Camp (SLON Gulag). His students were also arrested. Rudnytsky was also sentenced to forced labour in the White Sea–Baltic Canal. In 1935, he was transferred to the Solovets Islands. In late 1937 he was transferred from the islands to another Siberian forced-labor camp. On October 9, 1937, the NKVD tribunal of Leningrad oblast sentenced Rudnytsky to death. He was executed by shooting on November 3 in the Sandarmokh grove. His execution was part of the mass repressions against Ukrainian intelligentsia.

== Legacy ==
In 1965, Stepan Rudnytsky was officially rehabilitated by Soviet authorities, acknowledging that the charges against him were unfounded. This was largely prompted by the efforts of geographers at Lviv University, who advocated for the restoration of his reputation. Following his rehabilitation, Rudnytsky's work began to be recognized by scholarship and historians as a foundational figure in Ukrainian geology.

== Notable works ==
His most notable works were Korotka heohrafiia Ukrainy (Brief Geography of Ukraine) and the first Ukrainian world map featuring Ukrainian-language place names. The former work was published in two volumes in 1910 and 1914, and written specifically for schools and the general reader. The book championed the terms "Ukraine" and "Ukrainians", explained that "Rus" and "Rusyn" were outdated for the area, and considered terms like "Malorossiia" (Little Russia) to be inappropriate for foreign actors.
