= Index map =

Map which represents detailed maps with a grid overlay

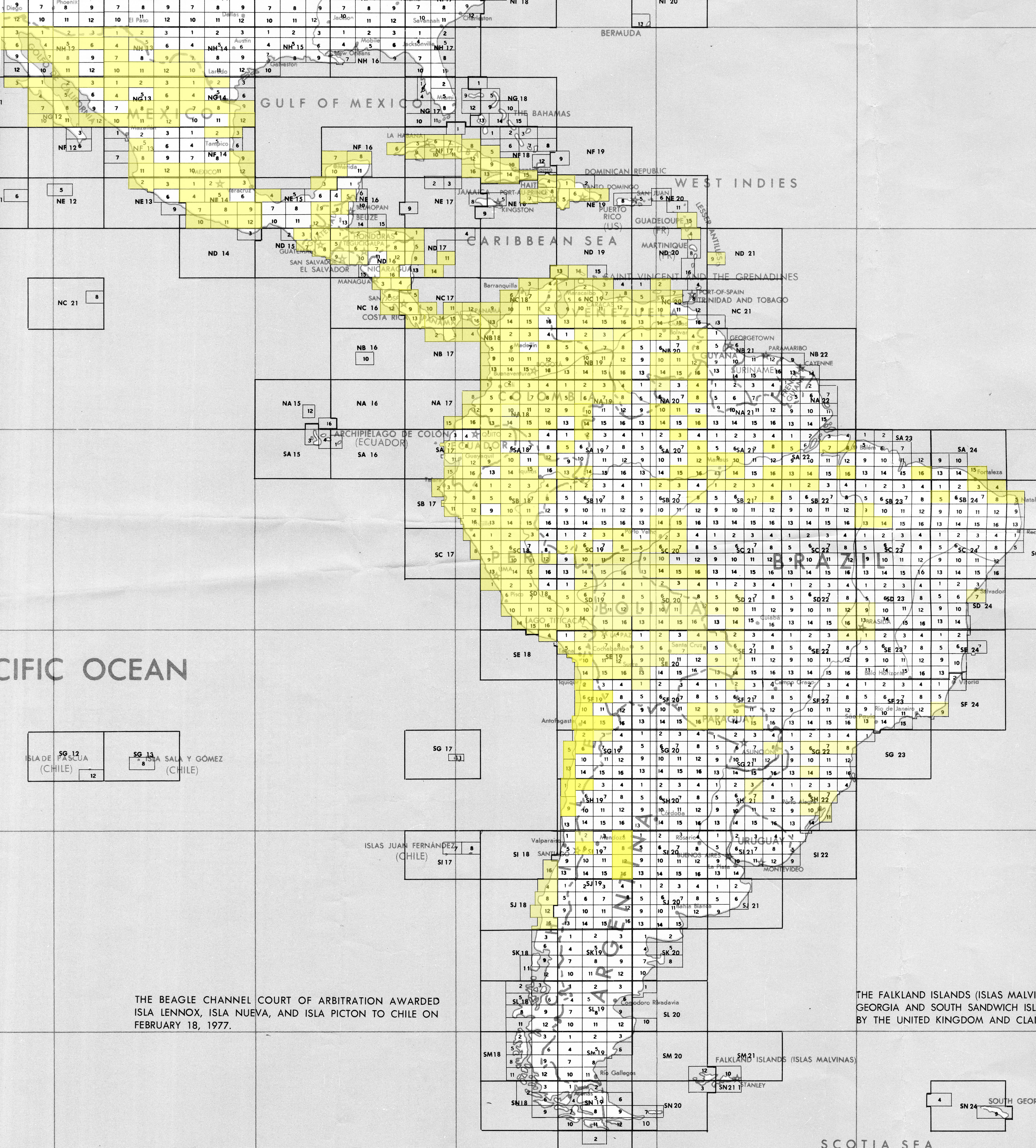
An index map of South and Central America

An index map is a finding aid for a set of maps covering regions of interest along with a name or number of the relevant map sheet. It provides geospatial data on either a sheet of paper or a computer display, like a gazetteer, with the location (such as a call number) represented within a grid overlaying the map's surface.

Geospatial data is often preferred to political borders, which often change. Information is searchable by coordinates, rather than the metadata for a particular country and region that can be entered into a catalog. In various institutions, maps are cataloged individually or as sets, resulting in various levels of specificity.
