= Conformal map projection =

Map projection in which every angle between two curves that cross each other is preserved

In cartography, a conformal map projection is one in which every angle between two curves that cross each other on Earth (a sphere or an ellipsoid) is preserved in the image of the projection; that is, the projection is a conformal map in the mathematical sense. For example, if two roads cross each other at a 39° angle, their images on a map with a conformal projection cross at a 39° angle.

== Properties ==
A conformal projection can be defined as one that is locally conformal at every point on the map, albeit possibly with singular points where conformality fails. Thus, every small figure is nearly similar to its image on the map. The projection preserves the ratio of two lengths in the small domain. All of the projection's Tissot's indicatrices are circles.

Conformal projections preserve only small figures. Large figures are distorted by even conformal projections.

In a conformal projection, any small figure is similar to the image, but the ratio of similarity (scale) varies by location, which explains the distortion of the conformal projection.

In a conformal projection, parallels and meridians cross rectangularly on the map; but not all maps with this property are conformal. The counterexamples are equirectangular and equal-area cylindrical projections (of normal aspects). These projections expand meridian-wise and parallel-wise by different ratios respectively. Thus, parallels and meridians cross rectangularly on the map, but these projections do not preserve other angles; i.e. these projections are not conformal.

As proven by Leonhard Euler in 1775, a conformal map projection cannot be equal-area, nor can an equal-area map projection be conformal. This is also a consequence of Carl Gauss's 1827 Theorema Egregium [Remarkable Theorem].

A conformal parameterization of a disc-like domain on the sphere is deemed scale-optimal when it minimizes the ratio of maximum to minimum scale across the entire map. This occurs by assigning a unit scale to the boundary of the disc. Chebyshev applied this theorem to create a conformal map for the European part of the Russian Empire, which reduced scale errors to 1/50.

== List of conformal projections ==
- Mercator projection (conformal cylindrical projection)
  - Mercator projection of normal aspect (Every rhumb line is drawn as a straight line on the map.)
  - Transverse Mercator projection
    - Gauss–Krüger coordinate system (This projection preserves lengths on the central meridian on an ellipsoid)
  - Oblique Mercator projection
    - Space-oblique Mercator projection (a modified projection from Oblique Mercator projection for satellite orbits with the Earth rotation within near conformality)
- Lambert conformal conic projection
  - Oblique conformal conic projection (This projection is sometimes used for long-shaped regions, like as continents of Americas or Japanese archipelago.)
- Stereographic projection (Conformal azimuthal projection. Every circle on the earth is drawn as a circle or a straight line on the map.)
  - Miller Oblated Stereographic Projection (Modified stereographic projection for continents of Africa and Europe.)
  - GS50 projection (This projection are made from a stereographic projection with an adjustment by a polynomial on complex numbers.)
- Littrow projection (conformal retro-azimuthal projection)
- Lagrange projection (a polyconic projection, and a composition of a Lambert conformal conic projection and a Möbius transformation.)
  - August epicycloidal projection (a composition of Lagrange projection of sphere in circle and a polynomial of degree 3 on complex numbers.)
- Application of elliptic function
  - Peirce quincuncial projection (This projects the Earth into a square conformally except at four singular points.)
  - Lee conformal projection of the world in a tetrahedron

== Applications ==
=== Large scale ===
Many large-scale maps use conformal projections because figures in large-scale maps can be regarded as small enough. The figures on the maps are nearly similar to their physical counterparts.

A non-conformal projection can be used in a limited domain such that the projection is locally conformal. Glueing many maps together restores roundness. To make a new sheet from many maps or to change the center, the body must be re-projected.

Seamless online maps can be very large Mercator projections, so that any place can become the map's center, then the map remains conformal. However, it is difficult to compare lengths or areas of two far-off figures using such a projection.

The Universal Transverse Mercator coordinate system and the Lambert system in France are projections that support the trade-off between seamlessness and scale variability.

=== For small scale ===
A contour chart of scale factors of GS50 projection

Maps reflecting directions, such as a nautical chart or an aeronautical chart, are projected by conformal projections. Maps treating values whose gradients are important, such as a weather map with atmospheric pressure, are also projected by conformal projections.

Small scale maps have large scale variations in a conformal projection, so recent world maps use other projections. Historically, many world maps are drawn by conformal projections, such as Mercator maps or hemisphere maps by stereographic projection.

Conformal maps containing large regions vary scales by locations, so it is difficult to compare lengths or areas. However, some techniques require that a length of 1 degree on a meridian = 111 km = 60 nautical miles. In non-conformal maps, such techniques are not available because the same lengths at a point vary the lengths on the map.

In Mercator or stereographic projections, scales vary by latitude, so bar scales by latitudes are often appended. In complex projections such as of oblique aspect. Contour charts of scale factors are sometimes appended.

== See also ==
- List of map projections
