= Vertical perspective =

Vertical perspective may mean:

- A form of perspective (graphical) used in Ancient Egypt, where nearer figures are shown below larger ones
- The special case of the General Perspective projection where the camera (in space) directly faces the centre of the Earth
