= Jean-Charles della Faille =

Flemish Jesuit mathematician (1597–1652)

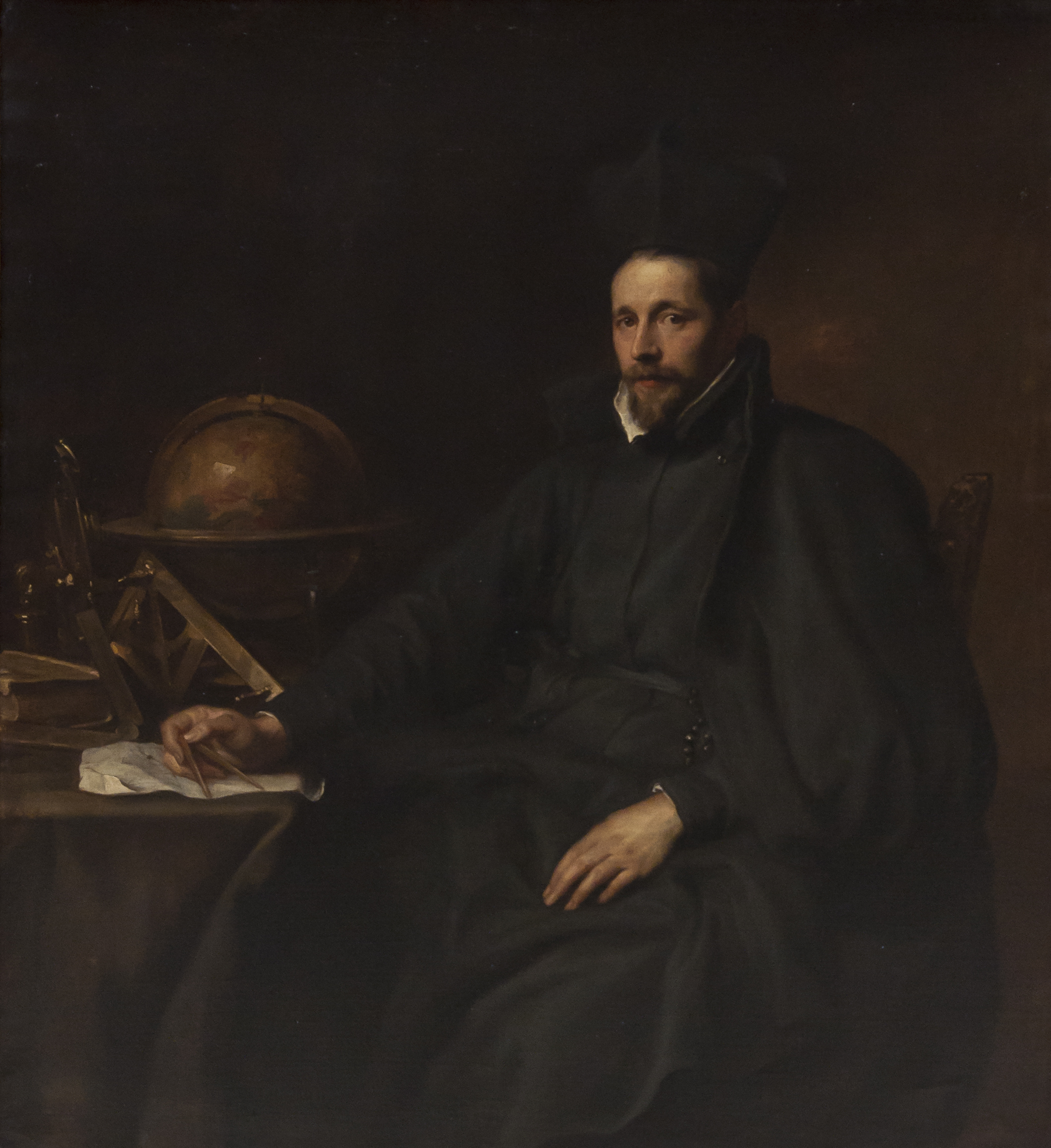
Portrait of Jean-Charles della Faille, by Anthony van Dyck.

Jean-Charles della Faille (Dutch: Jan-Karel della Faille, Spanish: Juan Carlos della Faille), born in Antwerp, 1 March 1597 and died in Barcelona, 4 November 1652, was a Flemish Jesuit priest from Brabant, and a mathematician of repute.

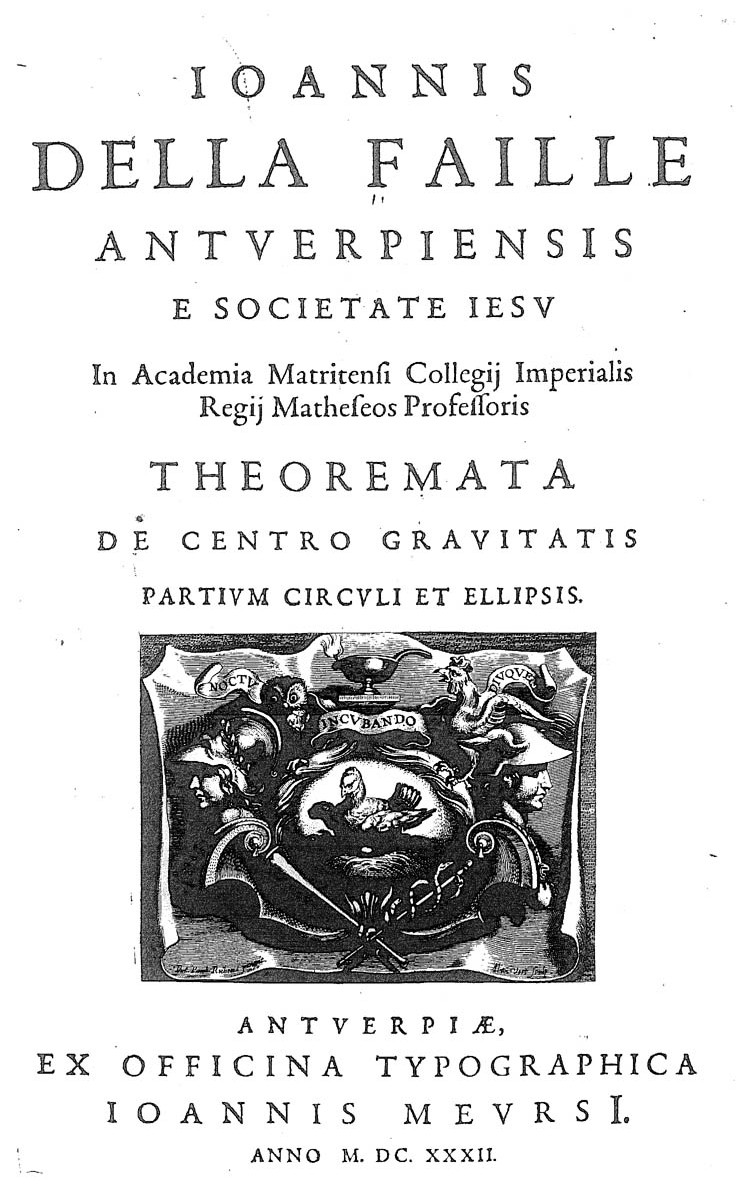
Theoremata de centro gravitatis partium circulis et ellipsis, 1632

== Biography ==
Jean-Charles della Faille was born in Antwerp, part of the Spanish Empire at that time. He was educated at the Jesuit school founded by François d'Aguilon, and joined the Jesuit order in 1613. He then went to a Jesuit college in Mechelen for two years. Afterwards, he came back to Antwerp where, as one of the best Mathematics' students of Grégoire de Saint-Vincent, he became also his disciple. In 1620, he went to Dole, also part of the Spanish Empire, to teach mathematics and learn theology in view of being ordained to the priesthood. The ordination took place 10 April 1621.

From 1626 to 1628, he taught mathematics at the Jesuit scholasticate of Louvain, before being appointed to the Imperial College in Madrid. He there advised Philip IV, king of Spain, on military questions, specially fortifications, and taught mathematics as well.

His most famous book is Theoremata de centro gravitatis partium circuli et ellipsis (1632) in which he determined the centre of gravity of the sector of a circle, for the first time. At the request of della Faille's family, the Flemish painter Anthony van Dyck painted a portrait of the mathematician in 1629. The portrait shows the mathematician in his Jesuit outfit with a set of tools (including a compass, a t-square and a globe).

He died in Barcelona, aged 55.

== See also ==
- List of Catholic clergy scientists
- List of Catholic clergy scientists
