= Richard Edes Harrison =

American cartographer (b. 1901, d. 1994)

Richard Edes Harrison (March 11, 1901 – January 5, 1994) was an American scientific illustrator and cartographer. He was the house cartographer of Fortune and a consultant at Life for almost two decades. He played a key role in "challenging cartographic perspectives and attempting to change spatial thinking on the everyday level during America’s rise to superpower status". Susan Schulten considers Harrison's maps "critical to the history of American cartography."

== Biography ==
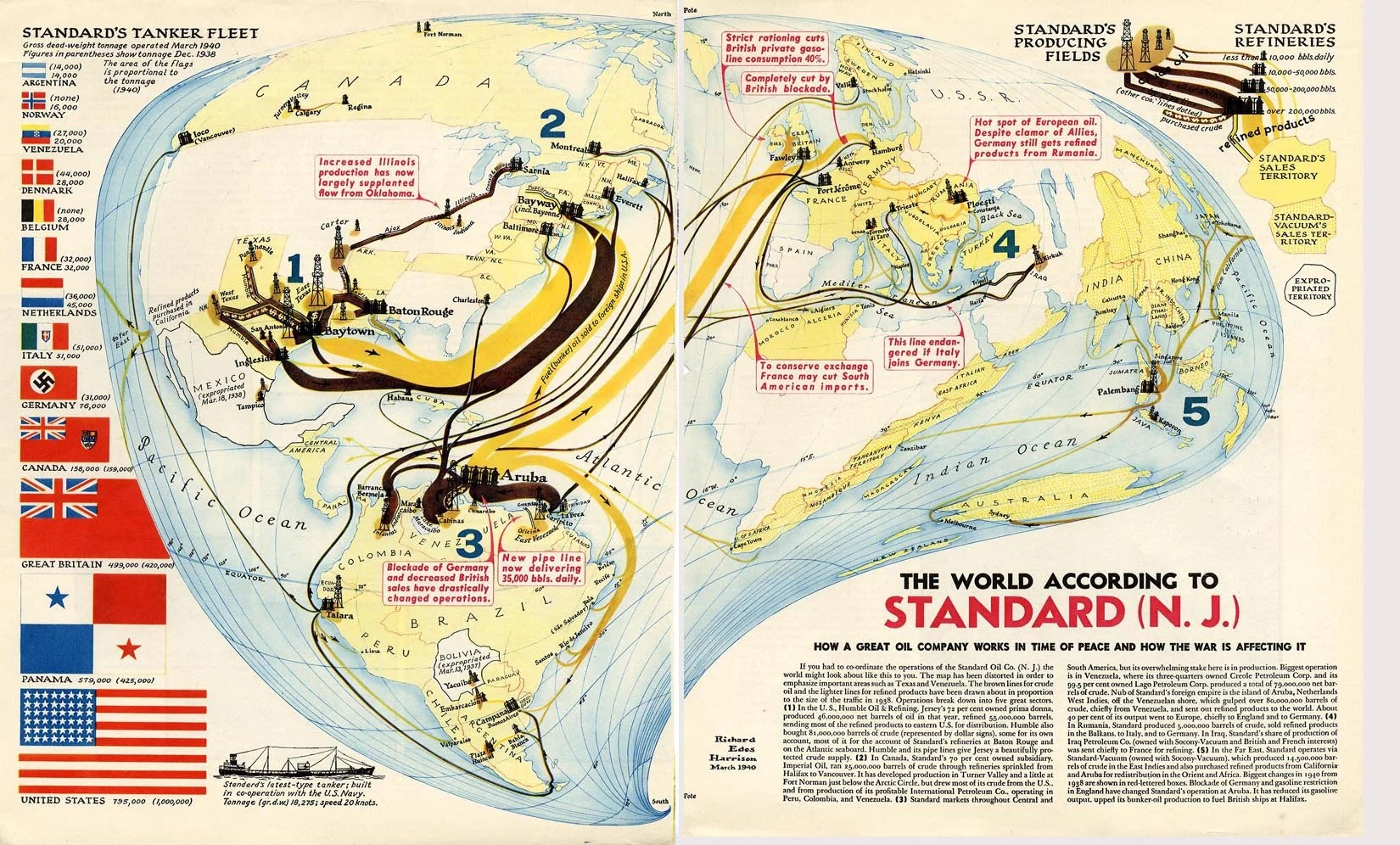
"The World According to Standard Oil Co." (1940)

Richard Edes Harrison's father was the biologist Ross Granville Harrison. He was born in Baltimore, Maryland in 1901. He spent his youth in New Haven and went to Yale College where he graduated with a major in zoology and a minor in chemistry. He worked for a time as a draftsman, working for the architect Cass Gilbert and decided to become an architect himself. To this effect, he went to the Yale School of Fine Arts in 1926 and spent four years there. Yet, in 1930, during the Great Depression, employment prospects for architects were not good so he made a living by working as a designer.

Harrison came to cartography "by chance" in 1932 when a friend asked him to momentarily replace a mapmaker working for Fortune. During World War II, his cartographic visualizations became very popular. In his maps and atlases, Harrison argued for examining geographic issues from multiple perspectives and breaking from conventions, such as overuse of the Mercator projection, and always placing north at the top of the map. His World representation using an azimuthal projection that was first published by Fortune in August 1941 under the title "The World Divided" became highly popular and was widely copied. He wanted to illustrate that "the entire conflict pivots around the U.S". A latter version entitled "One World, One War" was published on Fortune in March 1942. The US Army ordered 18000 copies of it. It displayed United States as a pivotal element of the World War, displaying how close it was to Nazi Germany occupied territories. During the war, Harrison also contributed to the Office War Information's War Atlas for Americans. The design of the United Nations logo was influenced by his azimuthal projection. His distinctive feature of the time was the usage of tilted perspective.

Harrison always considered himself more of an artist than a cartographer, but he had a highly successful career making maps for Fortune and Time. He was from 1936 to 1938 on the staff of Fortune. He worked from the 1940s to the 1950s as a map consultant at the State Department, and was also employed by the Office of Strategic Services (the precursor of the CIA) and the Museum of Modern Art. He lectured at Clark, Syracuse, Columbia and Trinity Universities. He was a member of the American Geographical Society and the Royal Geographical Society. Harrison produced several maps to illustrate Nicholas Spykman's America's Strategy in World Politics, a foundational work of 20th century geopolitics.

== Gallery ==
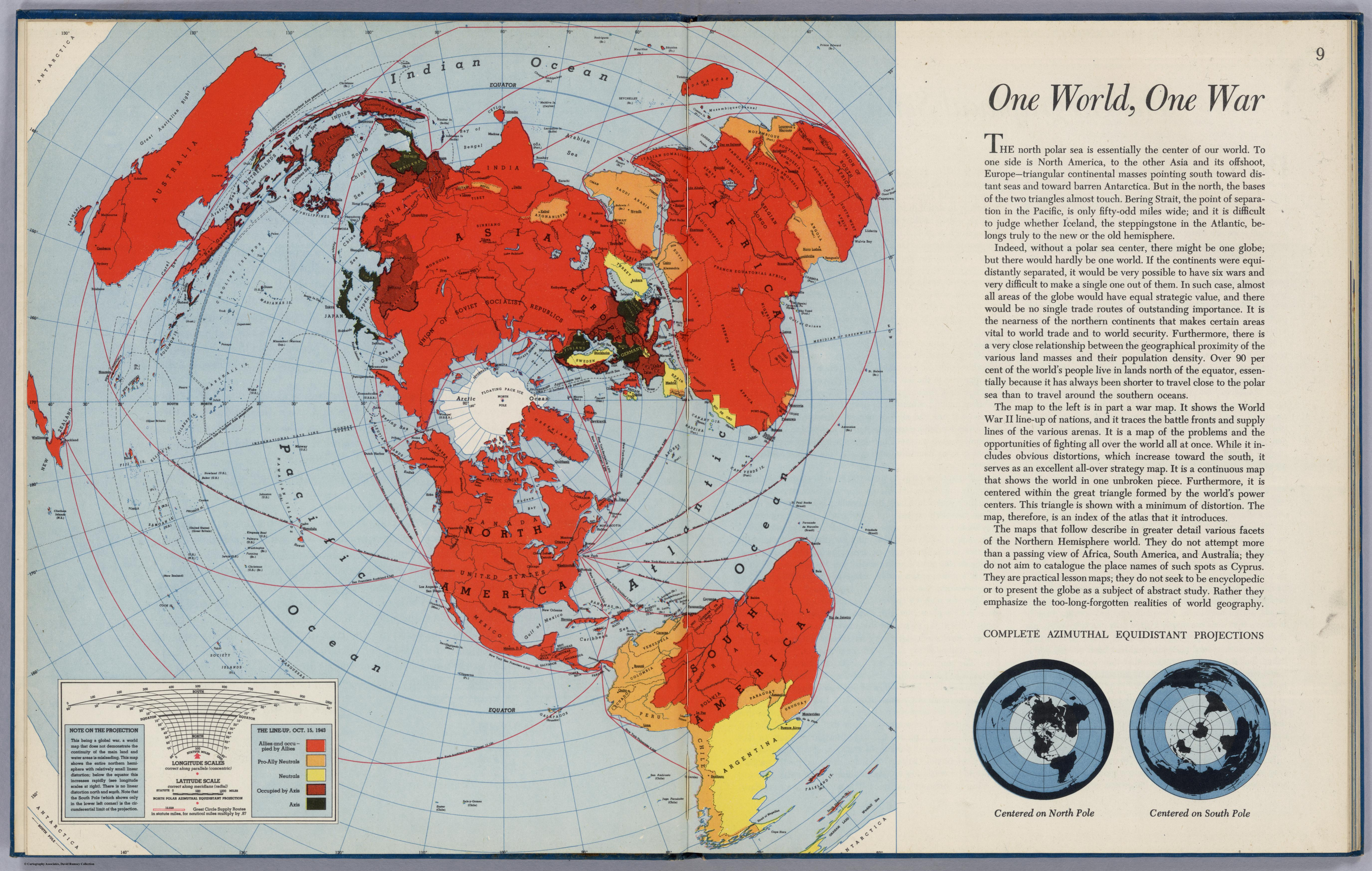
One World, One War (1944)

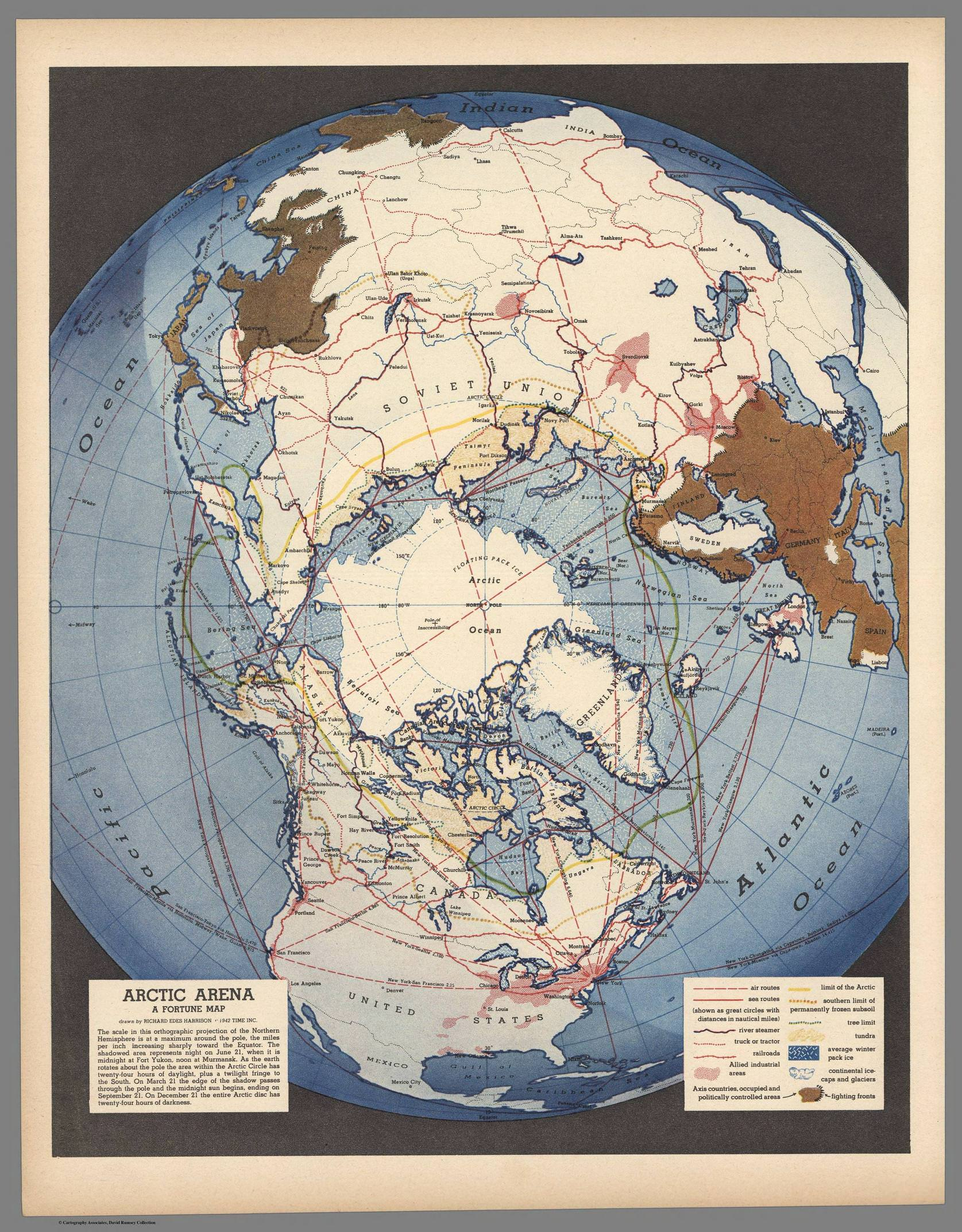
Arctic Arena (1942)

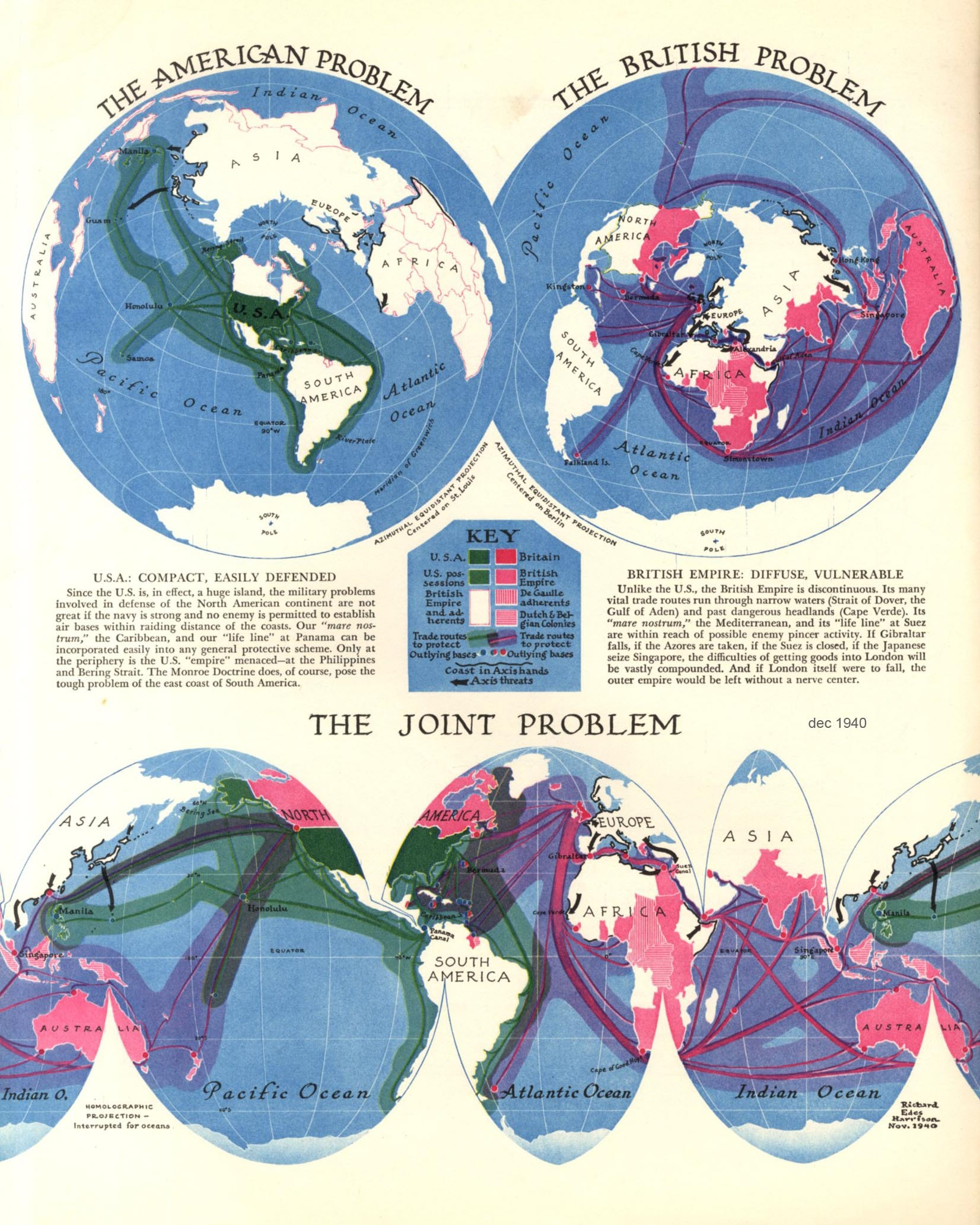
The Joint Problem (1940)

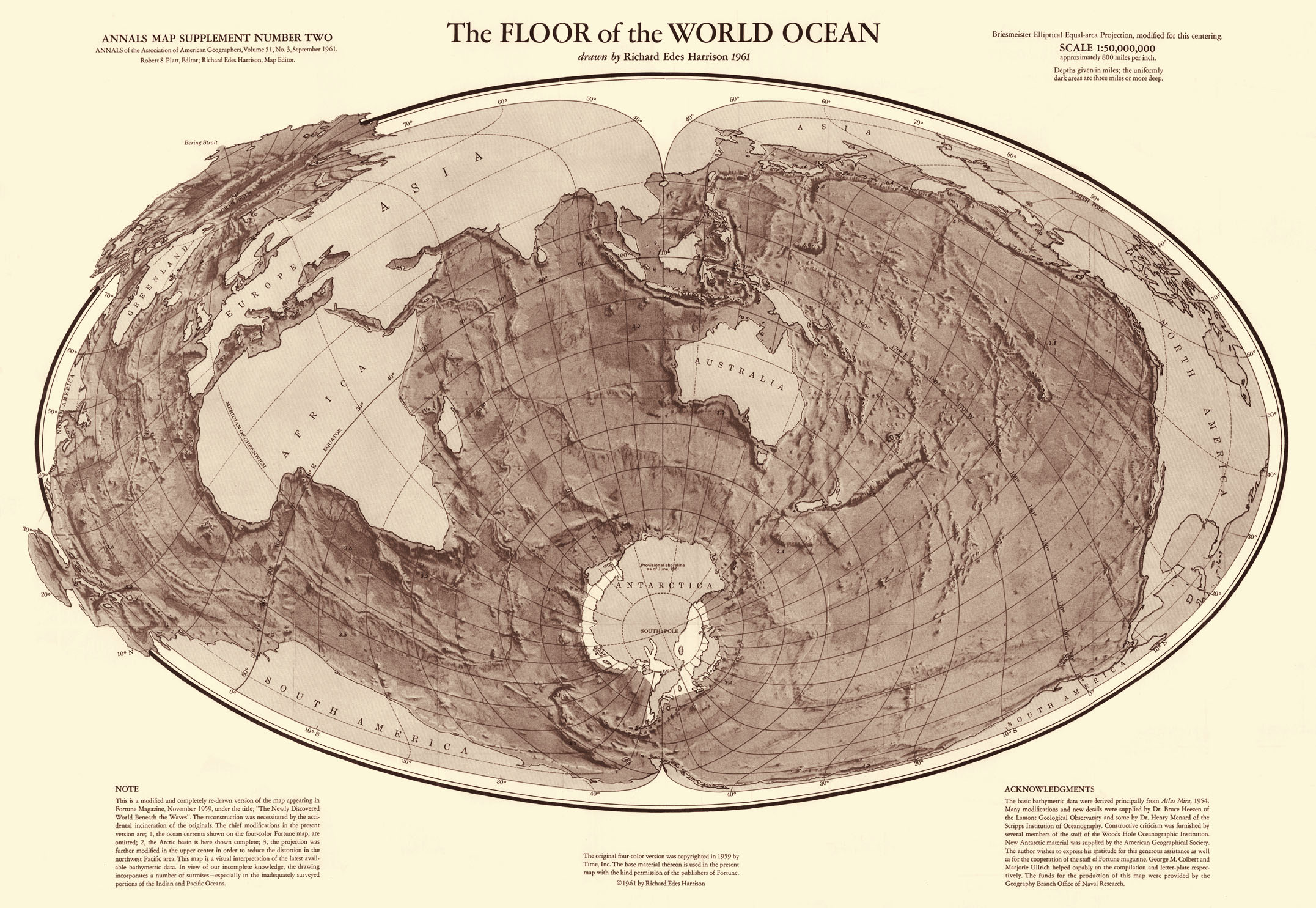
The Floor of the World Ocean (1961)

== Publications ==
- Harrison, Richard Edes (1944). Fortune magazine (ed.). Look at the World, The Fortune Atlas for World Strategy. New York: Alfred A Knopf.
- Harrison, Richard Edes (1945). Maps and How to Understand Them. New York: Consolidated Vultee Aircraft Corporation.
- Harrison, Richard Edes (1963). The Ginn World Atlas. Boston: Ginn and Company
- Dickinson, Robert L. and Harrison, RIchard Edes (1971). New York Walk Book. Garden City, NJ: Doubleday.
