= Roussilhe oblique stereographic projection =

Oblique stereographic map projection

Roussilhe oblique stereographic projection of the world

The Roussilhe oblique stereographic projection is a mapping projection developed by Henri Roussilhe in 1922. The projection uses a truncated series to approximate an oblique stereographic projection for the ellipsoid. The projection received some attention in the former Soviet Union.

The development of the Bulgarian oblique stereographic projection was done for Romania by the Bulgarian geodesist, Hristow, in the late 1930s.

== See also ==
- Map projection
- List of map projections
- Cartography
