= GS50 projection =

Conformal map projection

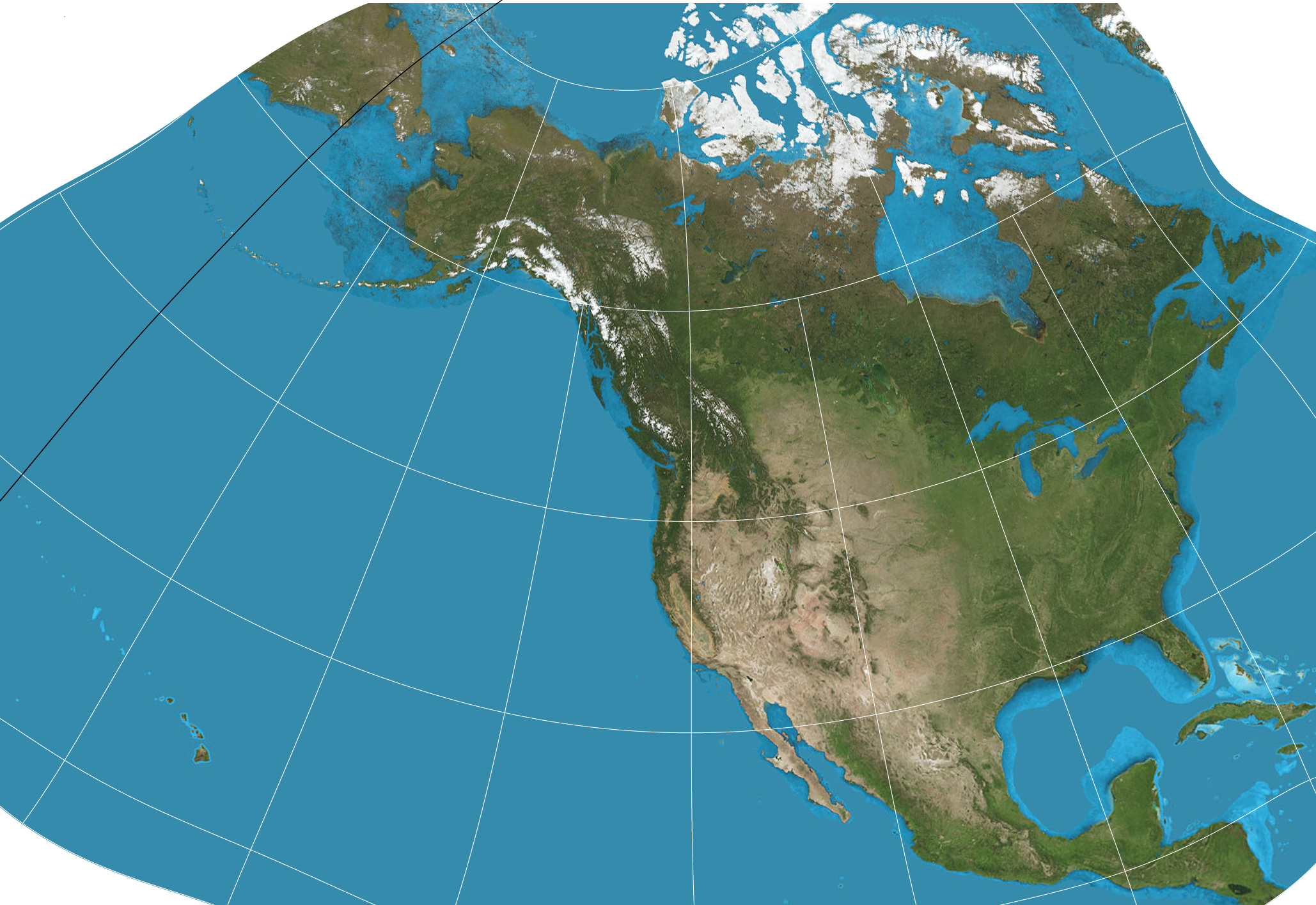
GS50 projection with 15° graticule

GS50 projection, with lines of constant scale factor superimposed. All 50 states, including islands and passages between Alaska, Hawaii, and the conterminous 48 states are shown with scale factors ranging only from 1.02 to 0.98

GS50, also hyphenated as GS-50, is a map projection that was developed by John Parr Snyder of the USGS in 1982.

The GS50 projection provides a conformal projection suitable only for maps of the 50 United States. Scale varies less than 2% throughout the area covered. Distortion is very low as well. It is not a standard projection in the sense that it uses complex polynomials (of the tenth order) rather than a trigonometric formulation, though it was developed from an oblique stereographic projection.
