= Planisphaerium =

Work by Ptolemy

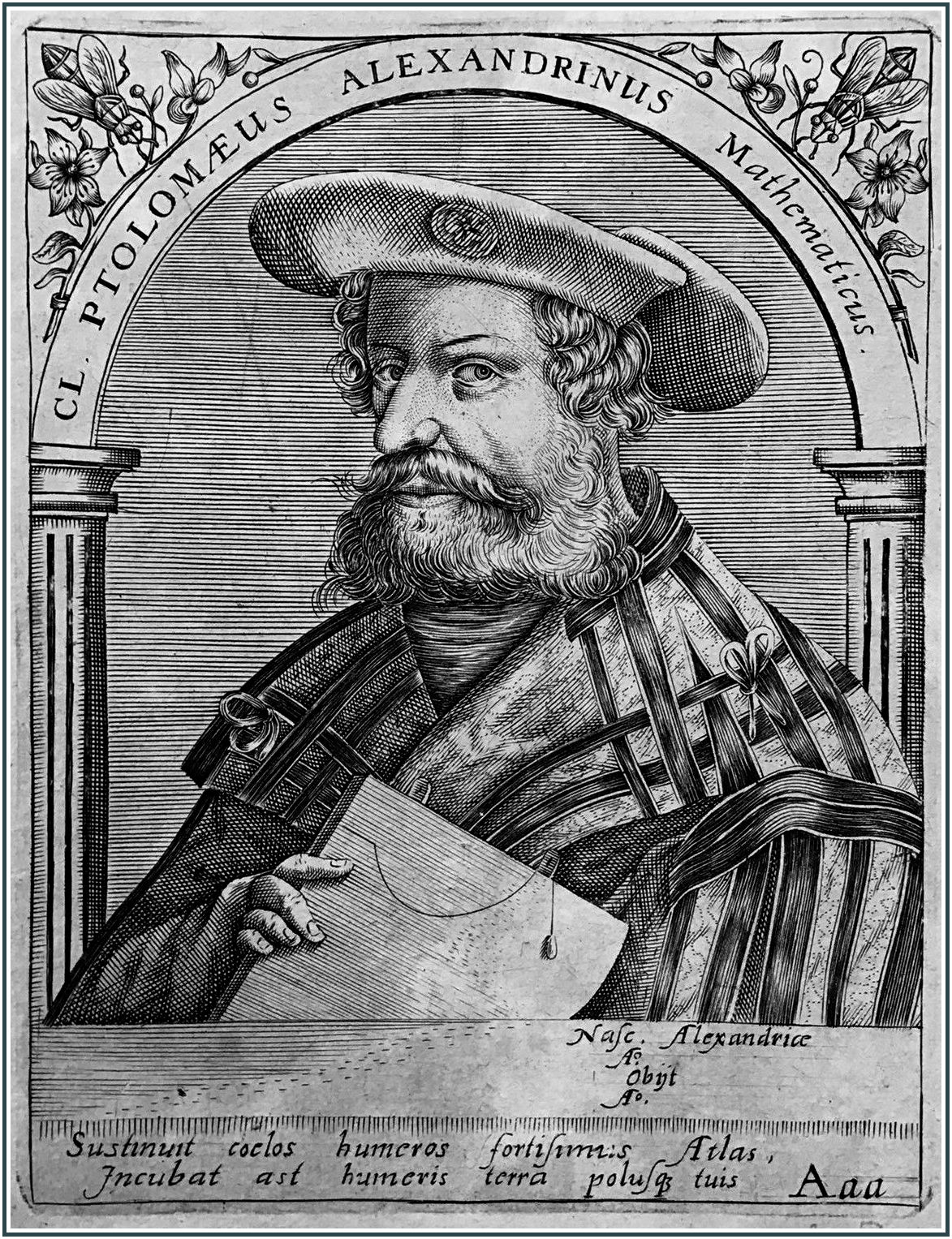
The mathematician Claudius Ptolemy 'the Alexandrian' as imagined by a 16th-century artist

The Planisphaerium is a work by Ptolemy. The title can be translated as "celestial plane" or "star chart". In this work Ptolemy explored the mathematics of mapping figures inscribed in the celestial sphere onto a plane by what is now known as stereographic projection. This method of projection preserves the properties of circles.

== Publication ==
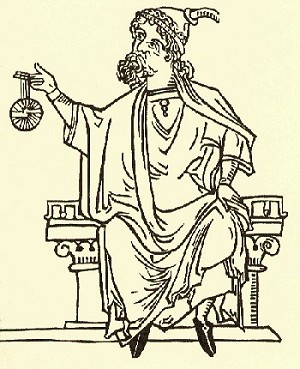
Herman of Carinthia, translator of Planisphaerium, with an astrolabe

Originally written in Ancient Greek, Planisphaerium was one of many scientific works which survived from antiquity in Arabic translation. One reason why Planisphaerium attracted interest was that stereographic projection was the mathematical basis of the plane astrolabe, an instrument which was widely used in the medieval Islamic world. The Suda lists a work of Ptolemy titled Simplification of the Sphere (Ancient Greek: Ἅπλωσις ἐπιφανείας σφαίρας) which is presumed to be Planisphaerium. In 1143 the work was translated from Arabic into Latin by Herman of Carinthia, who also translated commentaries by Maslamah Ibn Ahmad al-Majriti. The oldest known translation is in Arabic done by an unknown scholar as part of the Translation Movement in Baghdad.

== Planisphere ==
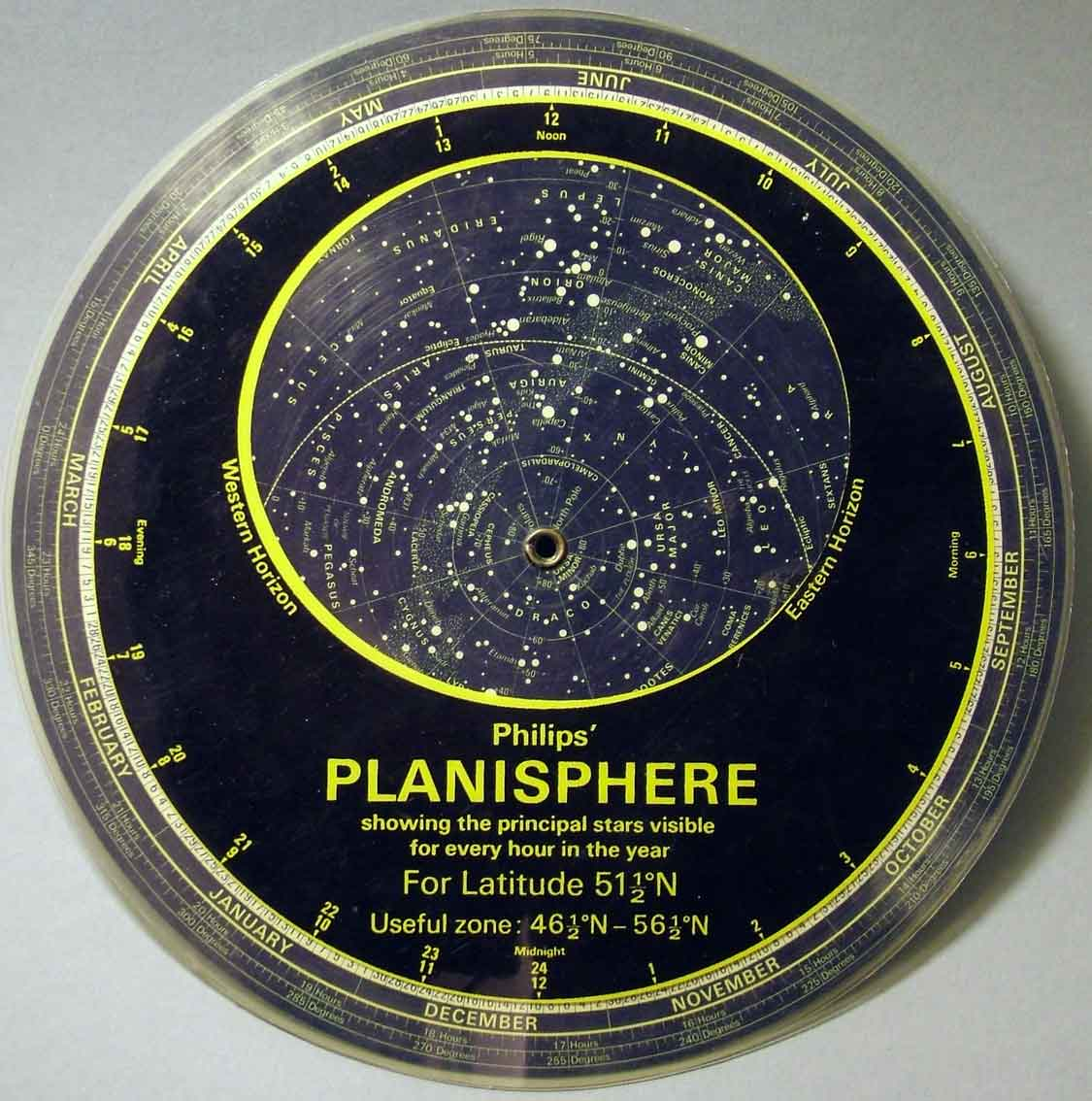
A plastic planisphere.

The word planisphere (Latin planisphaerium) was originally used in the second century by Ptolemy to describe the representation of a spherical Earth by a map drawn in the plane.

- Planisphere

== Editions and translations ==
- Commandino, Federico, ed. (1558). Ptolemaei Planisphaerium. Iordani Planisphaerium. Federici Commandini Vrbinatis in Ptolemaei Planisphaerium commentarius (in Latin). Venice: Paulus Manutius.
