= Spherical circle =

Mathematical expression of circle like slices of sphere

Small circle of a sphere.

In spherical geometry, a spherical circle (often shortened to circle) is the locus of points on a sphere at constant spherical distance (the spherical radius) from a given point on the sphere (the pole or spherical center). It is a curve of constant geodesic curvature relative to the sphere, analogous to a line or circle in the Euclidean plane; the curves analogous to straight lines are called great circles, and the curves analogous to planar circles are called small circles or lesser circles. If the sphere is embedded in three-dimensional Euclidean space, its circles are the intersections of the sphere with planes, and the great circles are intersections with planes passing through the center of the sphere.

== Fundamental concepts ==
=== Intrinsic characterization ===
A spherical circle with zero geodesic curvature is called a great circle, and is a geodesic analogous to a straight line in the plane. A great circle separates the sphere into two equal hemispheres, each with the great circle as its boundary. If a great circle passes through a point on the sphere, it also passes through the antipodal point (the unique furthest other point on the sphere). For any pair of distinct non-antipodal points, a unique great circle passes through both. Any two points on a great circle separate it into two arcs analogous to line segments in the plane; the shorter is called the minor arc and is the shortest path between the points, and the longer is called the major arc.

A circle with non-zero geodesic curvature is called a small circle, and is analogous to a circle in the plane. A small circle separates the sphere into two spherical disks or spherical caps, each with the circle as its boundary. For any triple of distinct non-antipodal points a unique small circle passes through all three. Any two points on the small circle separate it into two arcs, analogous to circular arcs in the plane.

Every circle has two antipodal poles (or centers) intrinsic to the sphere. A great circle is equidistant to its poles, while a small circle is closer to one pole than the other. Concentric circles are sometimes called parallels, because they each have constant distance to each-other, and in particular to their concentric great circle, and are in that sense analogous to parallel lines in the plane.

=== Extrinsic characterization ===
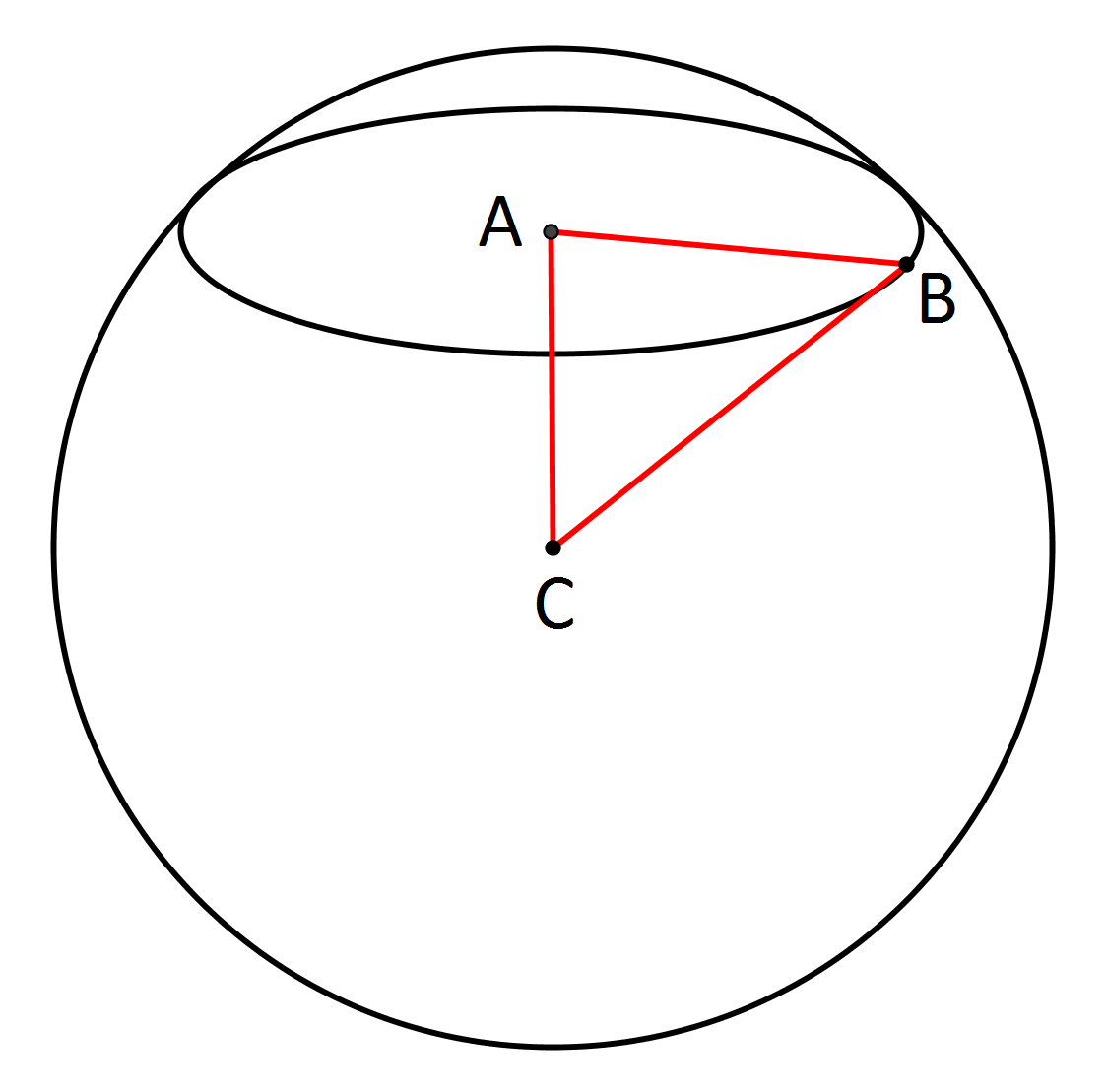
$BC^2=AB^2+AC^2$, where C is the center of the sphere, A is the center of the small circle, and B is a point in the boundary of the small circle. Therefore, knowing the radius of the sphere, and the distance from the plane of the small circle to C, the radius of the small circle can be determined using the Pythagorean theorem.

If the sphere is isometrically embedded in Euclidean space, the sphere's intersection with a plane is a circle, which can be interpreted extrinsically to the sphere as a Euclidean circle: a locus of points in the plane at a constant Euclidean distance (the extrinsic radius) from a point in the plane (the extrinsic center). A great circle lies on a plane passing through the center of the sphere, so its extrinsic radius is equal to the radius of the sphere itself, and its extrinsic center is the sphere's center. A small circle lies on a plane not passing through the sphere's center, so its extrinsic radius is smaller than that of the sphere and its extrinsic center is an arbitrary point in the interior of the sphere. Parallel planes cut the sphere into parallel (concentric) small circles; the pair of parallel planes tangent to the sphere are tangent at the poles of these circles, and the diameter through these poles, passing through the sphere's center and perpendicular to the parallel planes, is called the axis of the parallel circles.

The sphere's intersection with a second sphere is also a circle, and the sphere's intersection with a concentric right circular cylinder or right circular cone is a pair of antipodal circles.

== Applications ==
=== Geodesy ===
In the geographic coordinate system on a globe, the parallels of latitude are small circles, with the Equator the only great circle. By contrast, all meridians of longitude, paired with their opposite meridian in the other hemisphere, form great circles.
