= Scale (map) =

Ratio of distance on a map to the corresponding distance on the ground

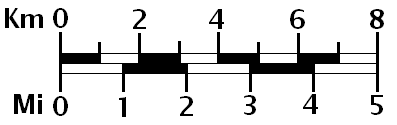
A graphical or bar scale. A map would also usually give its scale numerically ("1:50,000", for instance, means that one cm on the map represents 50,000cm of real space, which is 500 metres)

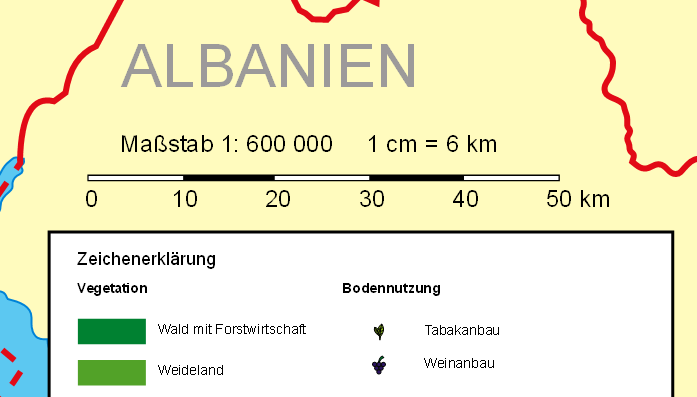
A bar scale with the nominal scale expressed as "1:600 000", meaning 1 cm on the map corresponds to 600,000 cm=6 km on the ground. (Note: The text "1cm = 6km" is an abuse of notation for the equals sign; strictly, 1 cm=0.00001 km, as per definition of the metric prefixes.)

The scale of a map is the ratio of a distance on the map to the corresponding distance on the ground. This simple concept is complicated by the curvature of the Earth's surface, which forces scale to vary across a map. Because of this variation, the concept of scale becomes meaningful in two distinct ways.

The first way is the ratio of the size of the generating globe to the size of the Earth. The generating globe is a conceptual model to which the Earth is shrunk and from which the map is projected. The ratio of the Earth's size to the generating globe's size is called the nominal scale (also called principal scale or representative fraction). Many maps state the nominal scale and may even display a bar scale (sometimes merely called a "scale") to represent it.

The second distinct concept of scale applies to the variation in scale across a map. It is the ratio of the mapped point's scale to the nominal scale. In this case 'scale' means the scale factor (also called point scale or particular scale).

If the region of the map is small enough to ignore Earth's curvature, such as in a town plan, then a single value can be used as the scale without causing measurement errors. In maps covering larger areas, or the whole Earth, the map's scale may be less useful or even useless in measuring distances. The map projection becomes critical in understanding how scale varies throughout the map. When scale varies noticeably, it can be accounted for as the scale factor. Tissot's indicatrix is often used to illustrate the variation of point scale across a map.

== History ==
The foundations for quantitative map scaling goes back to ancient China with textual evidence that the idea of map scaling was understood by the second century BC. Ancient Chinese surveyors and cartographers had ample technical resources used to produce maps such as counting rods, carpenter's squares, plumb lines, compasses for drawing circles, and sighting tubes for measuring inclination. Reference frames postulating a nascent coordinate system for identifying locations were hinted by ancient Chinese astronomers that divided the sky into various sectors or lunar lodges.

The Chinese cartographer and geographer Pei Xiu of the Three Kingdoms period created a set of large-area maps that were drawn to scale. He produced a set of principles that stressed the importance of consistent scaling, directional measurements, and adjustments in land measurements in the terrain that was being mapped.

== Terminology ==
=== Representation of scale ===
Map scales may be expressed in words (a lexical scale), as a ratio, or as a fraction. Examples are:

'one centimetre to one hundred metres' or 1:10,000 or 1/10,000
'one inch to one mile' or 1:63,360 or 1/63,360
'one centimetre to one thousand kilometres' or 1:100,000,000 or 1/100,000,000. (The ratio would usually be abbreviated to 1:100M)

=== Bar scale vs. lexical scale ===
In addition to the above many maps carry one or more (graphical) bar scales. For example, some modern British maps have three bar scales, one each for kilometres, miles and nautical miles.

A lexical scale in a language known to the user may be easier to visualise than a ratio: if the scale is an inch to two miles and the map user can see two villages that are about two inches apart on the map, then it is easy to work out that the villages are about four miles apart on the ground.

A lexical scale may cause problems if it expressed in a language that the user does not understand or in obsolete or ill-defined units. For example, a scale of one inch to a furlong (1:7920) will be understood by many older people in countries where Imperial units used to be taught in schools. But a scale of one pouce to one league may be about 1:144,000, depending on the cartographer's choice of the many possible definitions for a league, and only a minority of modern users will be familiar with the units used.

=== Large scale, medium scale, small scale ===
Contrast to spatial scale.

A small-scale map cover large regions, such as world maps, continents or large nations. In other words, they show large areas of land on a small space. They are called small scale because the representative fraction is relatively small.

Large-scale maps show smaller areas in more detail, such as county maps or town plans might. Such maps are called large scale because the representative fraction is relatively large. For instance a town plan, which is a large-scale map, might be on a scale of 1:10,000, whereas the world map, which is a small scale map, might be on a scale of 1:100,000,000.

The following table describes typical ranges for these scales but should not be considered authoritative because there is no standard:

Classification	Range	Examples
large scale	1:0 – 1:600,000	1:0.00001 for map of virus; 1:5,000 for walking map of town
medium scale	1:600,000 – 1:2,000,000	Map of a country
small scale	1:2,000,000 – 1:∞	1:50,000,000 for world map; 1:10^{21} for map of galaxy

The terms are sometimes used in the absolute sense of the table, but other times in a relative sense. For example, a map reader whose work refers solely to large-scale maps (as tabulated above) might refer to a map at 1:500,000 as small-scale.

In the English language, the word large-scale is often used to mean "extensive". However, as explained above, cartographers use the term "large scale" to refer to less extensive maps – those that show a smaller area. Maps that show an extensive area are "small scale" maps. This can be a cause of confusion.

=== Scale variation ===
Mapping large areas causes noticeable distortions because it significantly flattens the curved surface of the earth. How distortion gets distributed depends on the map projection. Scale varies across the map, and the stated map scale is only an approximation. This is discussed in detail below.

== Large-scale maps with curvature neglected ==
The region over which the earth can be regarded as flat depends on the accuracy of the survey measurements. If measured only to the nearest metre, then curvature of the earth is undetectable over a meridian distance of about 100 kilometres (62 mi) and over an east-west line of about 80 km (at a latitude of 45 degrees). If surveyed to the nearest 1 millimetre (0.039 in), then curvature is undetectable over a meridian distance of about 10 km and over an east-west line of about 8 km. Thus a plan of New York City accurate to one metre or a building site plan accurate to one millimetre would both satisfy the above conditions for the neglect of curvature. They can be treated by plane surveying and mapped by scale drawings in which any two points at the same distance on the drawing are at the same distance on the ground. True ground distances are calculated by measuring the distance on the map and then multiplying by the inverse of the scale fraction or, equivalently, simply using dividers to transfer the separation between the points on the map to a bar scale on the map.

== Point scale (or particular scale) ==
As proved by Gauss’s Theorema Egregium, a sphere (or ellipsoid) cannot be projected onto a plane without distortion. This is commonly illustrated by the impossibility of smoothing an orange peel onto a flat surface without tearing and deforming it. The only true representation of a sphere at constant scale is another sphere such as a globe.

Given the limited practical size of globes, we must use maps for detailed mapping. Maps require projections. A projection implies distortion: a constant separation on the map does not correspond to a constant separation on the ground. While a map may display a graphical bar scale, the scale must be used with the understanding that it will be accurate on only some lines of the map. (This is discussed further in the examples in the following sections.)

Let P be a point at latitude $\varphi$ and longitude $\lambda$ on the sphere (or ellipsoid). Let Q be a neighbouring point and let $\alpha$ be the angle between the element PQ and the meridian at P: this angle is the azimuth angle of the element PQ. Let P' and Q' be corresponding points on the projection. The angle between the direction P'Q' and the projection of the meridian is the bearing $\beta$. In general $\alpha\ne\beta$. Comment: this precise distinction between azimuth (on the Earth's surface) and bearing (on the map) is not universally observed, many writers using the terms almost interchangeably.

Definition: the point scale at P is the ratio of the two distances P'Q' and PQ in the limit that Q approaches P. We write this as

$$\mu(\lambda,\,\varphi,\,\alpha)=\lim_{Q\to P}\frac{P'Q'}{PQ},$$

where the notation indicates that the point scale is a function of the position of P and also the direction of the element PQ.

Definition: if P and Q lie on the same meridian $(\alpha=0)$, the meridian scale is denoted by $h(\lambda,\,\varphi)$ .

Definition: if P and Q lie on the same parallel $(\alpha=\pi/2)$, the parallel scale is denoted by $k(\lambda,\,\varphi)$.

Definition: if the point scale depends only on position, not on direction, we say that it is isotropic and conventionally denote its value in any direction by the parallel scale factor $k(\lambda,\varphi)$.

Definition: A map projection is said to be conformal if the angle between a pair of lines intersecting at a point P is the same as the angle between the projected lines at the projected point P', for all pairs of lines intersecting at point P. A conformal map has an isotropic scale factor. Conversely isotropic scale factors across the map imply a conformal projection.

Isotropy of scale implies that small elements are stretched equally in all directions, that is the shape of a small element is preserved. This is the property of orthomorphism (from Greek 'right shape'). The qualification 'small' means that at some given accuracy of measurement no change can be detected in the scale factor over the element. Since conformal projections have an isotropic scale factor they have also been called orthomorphic projections. For example, the Mercator projection is conformal since it is constructed to preserve angles and its scale factor is isotropic, a function of latitude only: Mercator does preserve shape in small regions.

Definition: on a conformal projection with an isotropic scale, points which have the same scale value may be joined to form the isoscale lines. These are not plotted on maps for end users but they feature in many of the standard texts. (See Snyder pages 203—206.)

=== The representative fraction (RF) or principal scale ===
There are two conventions used in setting down the equations of any given projection. For example, the equirectangular cylindrical projection may be written as

cartographers: $x=a\lambda$ $y=a\varphi$
mathematicians: $x=\lambda$ $y=\varphi$

Here we shall adopt the first of these conventions (following the usage in the surveys by Snyder). Clearly the above projection equations define positions on a huge cylinder wrapped around the Earth and then unrolled. We say that these coordinates define the projection map which must be distinguished logically from the actual printed (or viewed) maps. If the definition of point scale in the previous section is in terms of the projection map then we can expect the scale factors to be close to unity. For normal tangent cylindrical projections the scale along the equator is k=1 and in general the scale changes as we move off the equator. Analysis of scale on the projection map is an investigation of the change of k away from its true value of unity.

Actual printed maps are produced from the projection map by a constant scaling denoted by a ratio such as 1:100M (for whole world maps) or 1:10000 (for such as town plans). To avoid confusion in the use of the word 'scale' this constant scale fraction is called the representative fraction (RF) of the printed map and it is to be identified with the ratio printed on the map. The actual printed map coordinates for the equirectangular cylindrical projection are

printed map: $x=(RF)a\lambda$ $y=(RF)a\varphi$

This convention allows a clear distinction of the intrinsic projection scaling and the reduction scaling.

From this point we ignore the RF and work with the projection map.

=== Visualisation of point scale: the Tissot indicatrix ===
The Winkel tripel projection with Tissot's indicatrix of deformation

Consider a small circle on the surface of the Earth centred at a point P at latitude $\varphi$ and longitude $\lambda$. Since the point scale varies with position and direction the projection of the circle on the projection will be distorted. Tissot proved that, as long as the distortion is not too great, the circle will become an ellipse on the projection. In general the dimension, shape and orientation of the ellipse will change over the projection. Superimposing these distortion ellipses on the map projection conveys the way in which the point scale is changing over the map. The distortion ellipse is known as Tissot's indicatrix. The example shown here is the Winkel tripel projection, the standard projection for world maps made by the National Geographic Society. The minimum distortion is on the central meridian at latitudes of 30 degrees (North and South). (Other examples).

=== Point scale for normal cylindrical projections of the sphere ===

The key to a quantitative understanding of scale is to consider an infinitesimal element on the sphere. The figure shows a point P at latitude $\varphi$ and longitude $\lambda$ on the sphere. The point Q is at latitude $\varphi+\delta\varphi$ and longitude $\lambda+\delta\lambda$. The lines PK and MQ are arcs of meridians of length $a\,\delta\varphi$ where $a$ is the radius of the sphere and $\varphi$ is in radian measure. The lines PM and KQ are arcs of parallel circles of length $(a\cos\varphi)\delta\lambda$ with$\lambda$ in radian measure. In deriving a point property of the projection at P it suffices to take an infinitesimal element PMQK of the surface: in the limit of Q approaching P such an element tends to an infinitesimally small planar rectangle.

Infinitesimal elements on the sphere and a normal cylindrical projection

Normal cylindrical projections of the sphere have $x=a\lambda$ and $y$ equal to a function of latitude only. Therefore, the infinitesimal element PMQK on the sphere projects to an infinitesimal element P'M'Q'K' which is an exact rectangle with a base $\delta x=a\,\delta\lambda$ and height $\delta y$. By comparing the elements on sphere and projection we can immediately deduce expressions for the scale factors on parallels and meridians. (The treatment of scale in a general direction may be found below.)

parallel scale factor $\quad k\;=\;\dfrac{\delta x}{a\cos\varphi\,\delta\lambda\,}=\,\sec\varphi\qquad\qquad{}$
meridian scale factor $\quad h\;=\;\dfrac{\delta y}{a\,\delta\varphi\,} = \dfrac{y'(\varphi)}{a}$

Note that the parallel scale factor $k=\sec\varphi$ is independent of the definition of $y(\varphi)$ so it is the same for all normal cylindrical projections. It is useful to note that

at latitude 30 degrees the parallel scale is $k=\sec30^{\circ}=2/\sqrt{3}=1.15$
at latitude 45 degrees the parallel scale is $k=\sec45^{\circ}=\sqrt{2}=1.414$
at latitude 60 degrees the parallel scale is $k=\sec60^{\circ}=2$
at latitude 80 degrees the parallel scale is $k=\sec80^{\circ}=5.76$
at latitude 85 degrees the parallel scale is $k=\sec85^{\circ}=11.5$

The following examples illustrate three normal cylindrical projections and in each case the variation of scale with position and direction is illustrated by the use of Tissot's indicatrix.

=== Three examples of normal cylindrical projection ===
==== The equirectangular projection ====
The equidistant projection with Tissot's indicatrix of deformation

The equirectangular projection, also known as the Plate Carrée (French for "flat square") or (somewhat misleadingly) the equidistant projection, is defined by

$x = a\lambda,$ $y = a\varphi,$

where $a$ is the radius of the sphere, $\lambda$ is the longitude from the central meridian of the projection (here taken as the Greenwich meridian at $\lambda =0$) and $\varphi$ is the latitude. Note that $\lambda$ and $\varphi$ are in radians (obtained by multiplying the degree measure by a factor of $\pi$/180). The longitude $\lambda$ is in the range $[-\pi,\pi]$ and the latitude $\varphi$ is in the range $[-\pi/2,\pi/2]$.

Since $y'(\varphi)=1$ the previous section gives

parallel scale, $\quad k\;=\;\dfrac{\delta x}{a\cos\varphi\,\delta\lambda\,}=\,\sec\varphi\qquad\qquad{}$
meridian scale $\quad h\;=\;\dfrac{\delta y}{a\,\delta\varphi\,}=\,1$

For the calculation of the point scale in an arbitrary direction see addendum.

The figure illustrates the Tissot indicatrix for this projection. On the equator h=k=1 and the circular elements are undistorted on projection. At higher latitudes the circles are distorted into an ellipse given by stretching in the parallel direction only: there is no distortion in the meridian direction. The ratio of the major axis to the minor axis is $\sec\varphi$. Clearly the area of the ellipse increases by the same factor.

It is instructive to consider the use of bar scales that might appear on a printed version of this projection. The scale is true (k=1) on the equator so that multiplying its length on a printed map by the inverse of the RF (or principal scale) gives the actual circumference of the Earth. The bar scale on the map is also drawn at the true scale so that transferring a separation between two points on the equator to the bar scale will give the correct distance between those points. The same is true on the meridians. On a parallel other than the equator the scale is $\sec\varphi$ so when we transfer a separation from a parallel to the bar scale we must divide the bar scale distance by this factor to obtain the distance between the points when measured along the parallel (which is not the true distance along a great circle). On a line at a bearing of say 45 degrees ($\beta=45^{\circ}$) the scale is continuously varying with latitude and transferring a separation along the line to the bar scale does not give a distance related to the true distance in any simple way. (But see addendum). Even if a distance along this line of constant planar angle could be worked out, its relevance is questionable since such a line on the projection corresponds to a complicated curve on the sphere. For these reasons bar scales on small-scale maps must be used with extreme caution.

==== Mercator projection ====
The Mercator projection with Tissot's indicatrix of deformation. (The distortion increases without limit at higher latitudes)

The Mercator projection maps the sphere to a rectangle (of infinite extent in the $y$-direction) by the equations

$$x = a\lambda\,$$
$$y  = a\ln \left[\tan \left(\frac{\pi}{4} + \frac{\varphi}{2} \right) \right]$$

where a, $\lambda\,$ and $\varphi \,$ are as in the previous example. Since $y'(\varphi)=a\sec\varphi$ the scale factors are:

parallel scale $k\;=\;\dfrac{\delta x}{a\cos\varphi\,\delta\lambda\,}=\,\sec\varphi.$
meridian scale $h\;=\;\dfrac{\delta y}{a\,\delta\varphi\,}=\,\sec\varphi.$

In the mathematical addendum it is shown that the point scale in an arbitrary direction is also equal to $\sec\varphi$ so the scale is isotropic (same in all directions), its magnitude increasing with latitude as $\sec\varphi$. In the Tissot diagram each infinitesimal circular element preserves its shape but is enlarged more and more as the latitude increases.

==== Lambert's equal area projection ====
Lambert's normal cylindrical equal-area projection with Tissot's indicatrix of deformation

Lambert's equal area projection maps the sphere to a finite rectangle by the equations

$$x = a\lambda \qquad\qquad y  = a\sin\varphi$$

where a, $\lambda$ and $\varphi$ are as in the previous example. Since $y'(\varphi)=\cos\varphi$ the scale factors are

parallel scale $\quad k\;=\;\dfrac{\delta x}{a\cos\varphi\,\delta\lambda\,}=\,\sec\varphi\qquad\qquad{}$
meridian scale $\quad h\;=\;\dfrac{\delta y}{a\,\delta\varphi\,} = \,\cos\varphi$

The calculation of the point scale in an arbitrary direction is given below.

The vertical and horizontal scales now compensate each other (hk=1) and in the Tissot diagram each infinitesimal circular element is distorted into an ellipse of the same area as the undistorted circles on the equator.

==== Graphs of scale factors ====

The graph shows the variation of the scale factors for the above three examples. The top plot shows the isotropic Mercator scale function: the scale on the parallel is the same as the scale on the meridian. The other plots show the meridian scale factor for the Equirectangular projection (h=1) and for the Lambert equal area projection. These last two projections have a parallel scale identical to that of the Mercator plot. For the Lambert note that the parallel scale (as Mercator A) increases with latitude and the meridian scale (C) decreases with latitude in such a way that hk=1, guaranteeing area conservation.

=== Scale variation on the Mercator projection ===
The Mercator point scale is unity on the equator because it is such that the auxiliary cylinder used in its construction is tangential to the Earth at the equator. For this reason the usual projection should be called a tangent projection. The scale varies with latitude as $k=\sec\varphi$. Since $\sec\varphi$ tends to infinity as we approach the poles the Mercator map is grossly distorted at high latitudes and for this reason the projection is totally inappropriate for world maps (unless we are discussing navigation and rhumb lines). However, at a latitude of about 25 degrees the value of $\sec\varphi$ is about 1.1 so Mercator is accurate to within 10% in a strip of width 50 degrees centred on the equator. Narrower strips are better: a strip of width 16 degrees (centred on the equator) is accurate to within 1% or 1 part in 100.

A standard criterion for good large-scale maps is that the accuracy should be within 4 parts in 10,000, or 0.04%, corresponding to $k=1.0004$. Since $\sec\varphi$ attains this value at $\varphi=1.62$ degrees (see figure below, red line). Therefore, the tangent Mercator projection is highly accurate within a strip of width 3.24 degrees centred on the equator. This corresponds to north-south distance of about 360 km (220 mi). Within this strip Mercator is very good, highly accurate and shape preserving because it is conformal (angle preserving). These observations prompted the development of the transverse Mercator projections in which a meridian is treated 'like an equator' of the projection so that we obtain an accurate map within a narrow distance of that meridian. Such maps are good for countries aligned nearly north-south (like Great Britain) and a set of 60 such maps is used for the Universal Transverse Mercator (UTM). Note that in both these projections (which are based on various ellipsoids) the transformation equations for x and y and the expression for the scale factor are complicated functions of both latitude and longitude.

Scale variation near the equator for the tangent (red) and secant (green) Mercator projections.

=== Secant, or modified, projections ===
Comparison of tangent and secant cylindrical, conic and azimuthal map projections with standard parallels shown in red

The basic idea of a secant projection is that the sphere is projected to a cylinder which intersects the sphere at two parallels, say $\varphi_1$ north and south. Clearly the scale is now true at these latitudes whereas parallels beneath these latitudes are contracted by the projection and their (parallel) scale factor must be less than one. The result is that deviation of the scale from unity is reduced over a wider range of latitudes.

As an example, one possible secant Mercator projection is defined by

$$x = 0.9996a\lambda \qquad\qquad y  = 0.9996a\ln \left(\tan \left(\frac{\pi}{4} + \frac{\varphi}{2} \right) \right).$$

The numeric multipliers do not alter the shape of the projection but it does mean that the scale factors are modified:

secant Mercator scale, $\quad k\;=0.9996\sec\varphi.$

Thus

- the scale on the equator is 0.9996,
- the scale is k = 1 at a latitude given by $\varphi_1$ where $\sec\varphi_1=1/0.9996=1.00004$ so that $\varphi_1=1.62$ degrees,
- k=1.0004 at a latitude $\varphi_2$ given by $\sec\varphi_2=1.0004/0.9996=1.0008$ for which $\varphi_2=2.29$ degrees. Therefore, the projection has $1<k<1.0004$, that is an accuracy of 0.04%, over a wider strip of 4.58 degrees (compared with 3.24 degrees for the tangent form).

This is illustrated by the lower (green) curve in the figure of the previous section.

Such narrow zones of high accuracy are used in the UTM and the British OSGB projection, both of which are secant, transverse Mercator on the ellipsoid with the scale on the central meridian constant at $k_0=0.9996$. The isoscale lines with $k=1$ are slightly curved lines approximately 180 km east and west of the central meridian. The maximum value of the scale factor is 1.001 for UTM and 1.0007 for OSGB.

The lines of unit scale at latitude $\varphi_1$ (north and south), where the cylindrical projection surface intersects the sphere, are the standard parallels of the secant projection.

Whilst a narrow band with $|k-1|<0.0004$ is important for high accuracy mapping at a large scale, for world maps much wider spaced standard parallels are used to control the scale variation. Examples are

- Behrmann with standard parallels at 30N, 30S.
- Gall equal area with standard parallels at 45N, 45S.

Scale variation for the Lambert (green) and Gall (red) equal area projections.

The scale plots for the latter are shown below compared with the Lambert equal area scale factors. In the latter the equator is a single standard parallel and the parallel scale increases from k=1 to compensate the decrease in the meridian scale. For the Gall the parallel scale is reduced at the equator (to k=0.707) whilst the meridian scale is increased (to k=1.414). This gives rise to the gross distortion of shape in the Gall-Peters projection. (On the globe Africa is about as long as it is broad). Note that the meridian and parallel scales are both unity on the standard parallels.

=== Mathematical addendum ===
Infinitesimal elements on the sphere and a normal cylindrical projection

For normal cylindrical projections the geometry of the infinitesimal elements gives

$$\text{(a)}\quad
\tan\alpha=\frac{a\cos\varphi\,\delta\lambda}{a\,\delta\varphi},$$
$$\text{(b)}\quad
\tan\beta=\frac{\delta x}{\delta y}
=\frac{a\,\delta \lambda}{\delta y}.$$

The relationship between the angles $\beta$ and $\alpha$ is

$$\text{(c)}\quad
\tan\beta=\frac{a\sec\varphi}{y'(\varphi)} \tan\alpha.\,$$

For the Mercator projection $y'(\varphi)=a\sec\varphi$ giving $\alpha=\beta$: angles are preserved. (Hardly surprising since this is the relation used to derive Mercator). For the equidistant and Lambert projections we have $y'(\varphi)=a$ and $y'(\varphi)=a\cos\varphi$ respectively so the relationship between $\alpha$ and $\beta$ depends upon the latitude $\varphi$. Denote the point scale at P when the infinitesimal element PQ makes an angle $\alpha \,$ with the meridian by $\mu_{\alpha}.$ It is given by the ratio of distances:

$$\mu_\alpha = \lim_{Q\to P}\frac{P'Q'}{PQ}
= \lim_{Q\to P}\frac{\sqrt{\delta x^2 +\delta y^2}}
{\sqrt{ a^2\,  \delta\varphi^2+a^2\cos^2 \varphi\, \delta\lambda^2}}.$$

Setting $\delta x=a\,\delta\lambda$ and substituting $\delta\varphi$ and $\delta y$ from equations (a) and (b) respectively gives

$$\mu_\alpha(\varphi) = \sec\varphi \left[\frac{\sin\alpha}{\sin\beta}\right].$$

For the projections other than Mercator we must first calculate $\beta$ from $\alpha$ and $\varphi$ using equation (c), before we can find $\mu_{\alpha}$. For example, the equirectangular projection has $y'=a$ so that

$$\tan\beta=\sec\varphi \tan\alpha.\,$$

If we consider a line of constant slope $\beta$ on the projection both the corresponding value of $\alpha$ and the scale factor along the line are complicated functions of $\varphi$. There is no simple way of transferring a general finite separation to a bar scale and obtaining meaningful results.

== Ratio symbol ==
While the colon is often used to express ratios, Unicode can express a symbol specific to ratios, being slightly raised: U+2236 ∶ RATIO (&ratio;).

== See also ==
- Scale (geography)
- Geographic distance
- Scale (analytical tool)
- Scale (ratio)
- Scaling (geometry)
- Spatial scale
- On Exactitude in Science
