= Hobo–Dyer projection =

Cylindrical equal-area map projection

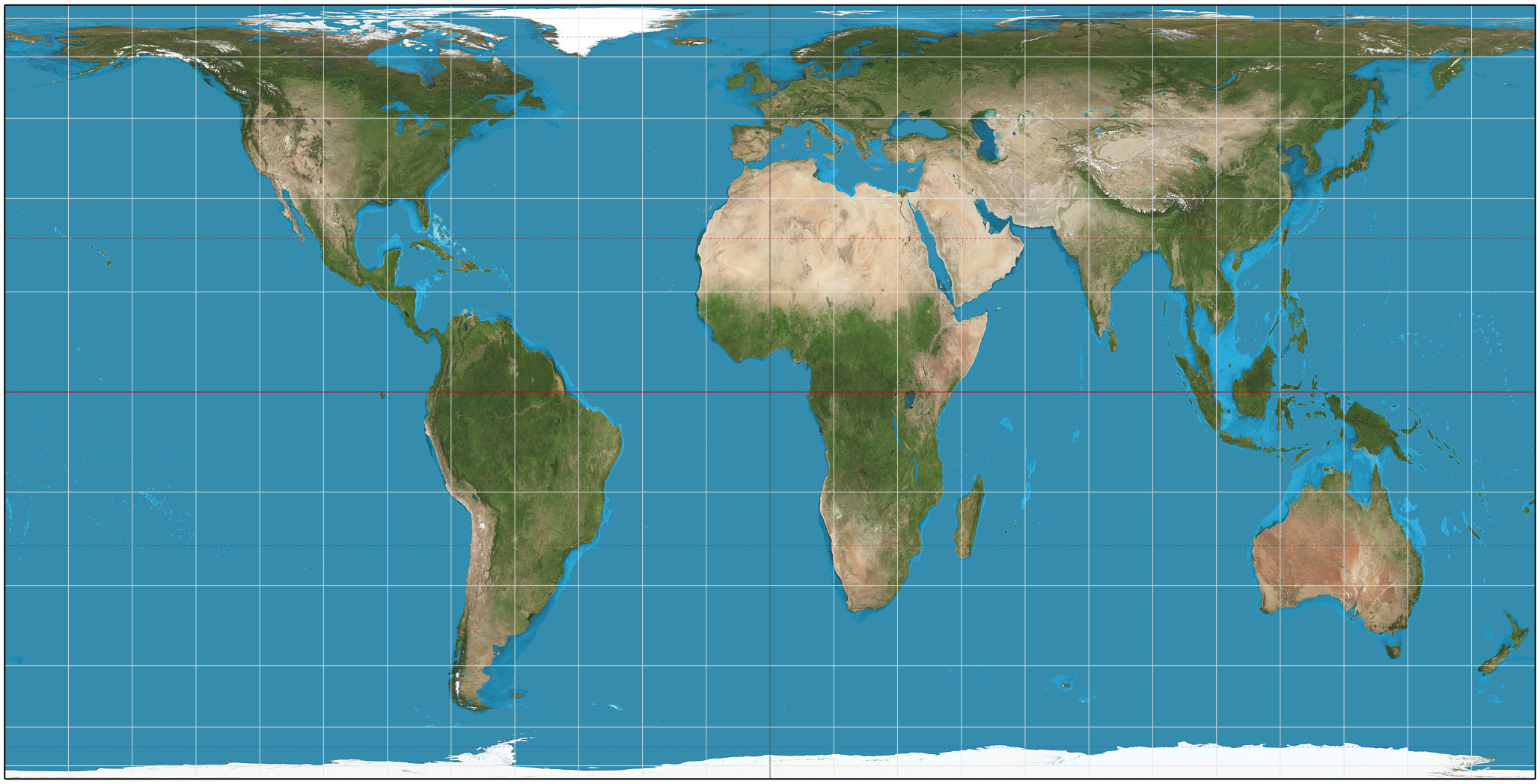
Hobo–Dyer projection of the world

The Hobo–Dyer cylindrical equal-area projection with Tissot's indicatrices of deformation

The Hobo–Dyer map projection is a normal cylindrical equal-area projection, with standard parallels (there is no north-south or east-west distortion) at 37.5° north and south of the equator. The map was commissioned in 2002 by Bob Abramms and Howard Bronstein of ODT Inc. and drafted by cartographer Mick Dyer, as a modification of the 1910 Behrmann projection. The name Hobo–Dyer is derived from Bronstein and Abramms's first names (Howard and Bob) and Dyer's surname.

The original ODT map is printed on two sides, one side with north upwards and the other with south upwards. That, together with its equal-area presentation, is intended to present a different perspective compared with more common non-equal area, north-up maps. The goal is similar to that of other equal-area projections (such as the Gall–Peters projection), but the Hobo–Dyer is billed by the publisher as "more visually satisfying". To that end, the map stretches the low latitudes vertically less than Peters, but at the price of greater compression near the poles.

In 2002, the Carter Center used the Hobo–Dyer projection in a map of its global locations that it circulated to mark its founder Jimmy Carter's receipt of the Nobel Peace Prize.

== See also ==
- List of map projections
