= James Gall =

Scottish clergyman and cartographer

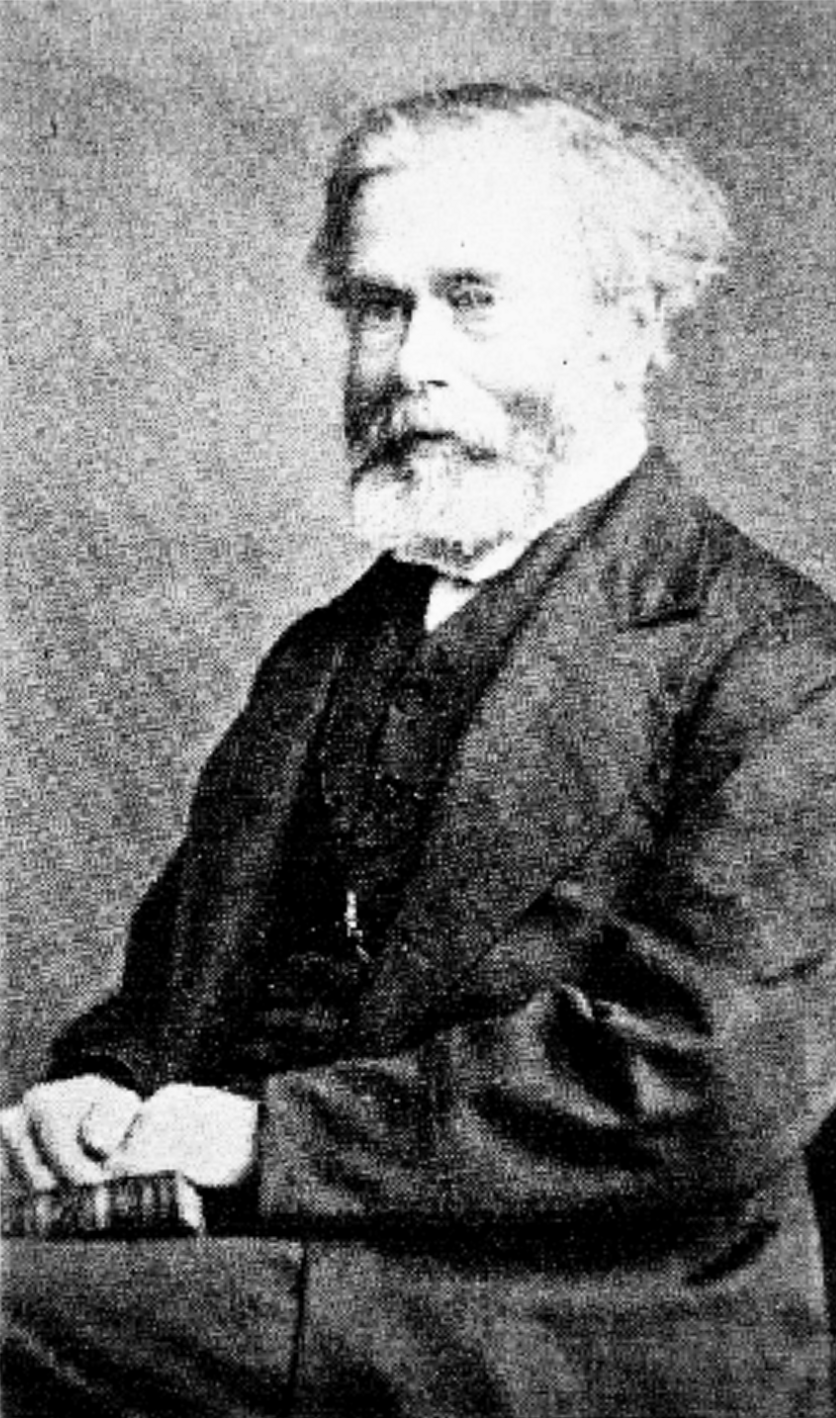
James Gall

James Gall (27 September 1808 – 7 February 1895) was a Scottish clergyman who founded the Carrubbers Close Mission. He was also a cartographer, publisher, sculptor, astronomer and author. In cartography he gives his name to three different map projections: Gall stereographic; Gall isographic; and Gall orthographic (Gall–Peters projection).

== Life ==
Gall was born on 27 September 1808, the son of Ann Collie and James Gall, a printer who founded the printing company of Gall & Inglis in Edinburgh, which specialised in easy-access astronomy. His uncle, John Gall, ran a coach-building business. He was baptised at St Cuthbert's Church, Edinburgh on 15 October 1808. He lived with his family at Potterrow on the South Side of Edinburgh.

He was educated at the High School close to his home and at the Trustees Academy. He was then apprenticed as a printer in his father's firm from 1822 before studying at the University of Edinburgh. From 1838 he became a partner in his father's publishing firm, which specialised in maps.

In 1849, aged 41, he decided to retrain as a Free Church minister and studied at New College, Edinburgh graduating in 1855. His first role was in the establishment of a mission at Carrubbers Close on the Royal Mile.

At this time he was still a partner in Gall & Inglis. He was living at Myrtle Bank in Trinity, Edinburgh.

In 1858 he was chosen to minister at the new Free Church in the Canongate, holding the overspill from the growing mission work at Carrubbers Close. This originally held services in a hall at Moray House until a building was completed in 1862. This stood on Holyrood Road on the Site now occupied by the main Moray College building. It was later named the Moray Free Church. He lived adjacent to the church at 10 St John Street. He resigned from the church in 1872 to concentrate on mission work. His place at the Moray Church was filled by Rev Walter Glendinning. He lost his manse at John Street as a result of this decision, and lived for a while thereafter at a flat at 47 Forrest Road.

He died at home, 35 Newington Road in Edinburgh on 7 February 1895. He is buried in the north-east section of Grange Cemetery in Edinburgh, nearby his father. His funeral took place on 11 February 1895 and was attended by over 600 of his many admirers.

== Religious views ==
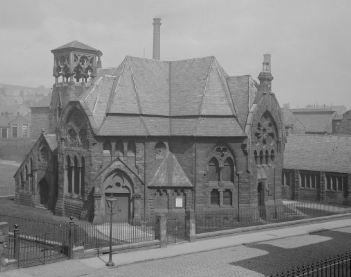
Moray Free Church, Holyrood Road, Edinburgh

Most of Gall's work on religion was detailed in a book called The Stars and the Angels, (1858) in which he not only argues for the existence of other planets inhabited by races of men, but describes the view that Gabriel would have had on his way from heaven to earth to tell Mary that she would have a baby next Christmas.

A rare, but important, work by Gall is The Synagogue Not the Temple, the Germ and Model of the Christian Church, published in 1890. It discusses the foundation upon which the Christian Church is modelled.

Gall in Primeeval Man Unveiled: or The Anthropology of the Bible, writes that "[t]he Bible narrative does not commence with [original] creation, as is commonly supposed, but with the formation of Adam and Eve, millions of years after our planet had been created. Its previous history, so far as Scripture is concerned, is yet unwritten."

== Astronomy ==
Gall's main work as an astronomer was with the constellations. As part of this work he developed the Gall orthographic projection, a derivative of the Lambert cylindrical equal-area projection, to project the celestial sphere onto flat paper in a manner that avoided distorting the shapes of the constellations. He also applied this technique to terrestrial mapmaking as a way to make a flat map of the round Earth. Gall Orthographic was re-invented by Arno Peters in 1967 and adopted by organisations such as UNESCO. In recognition of both men the form is now called the Gall-Peters projection.

Gall himself was an advocate of accessible mapping for blind people. One format he suggested was to combine Braille printing with twine to indicate lines. An 1851 book included such a map by Gall and his partner Inglis. It used raised borders to indicate county boundaries and other features.

== Publications ==
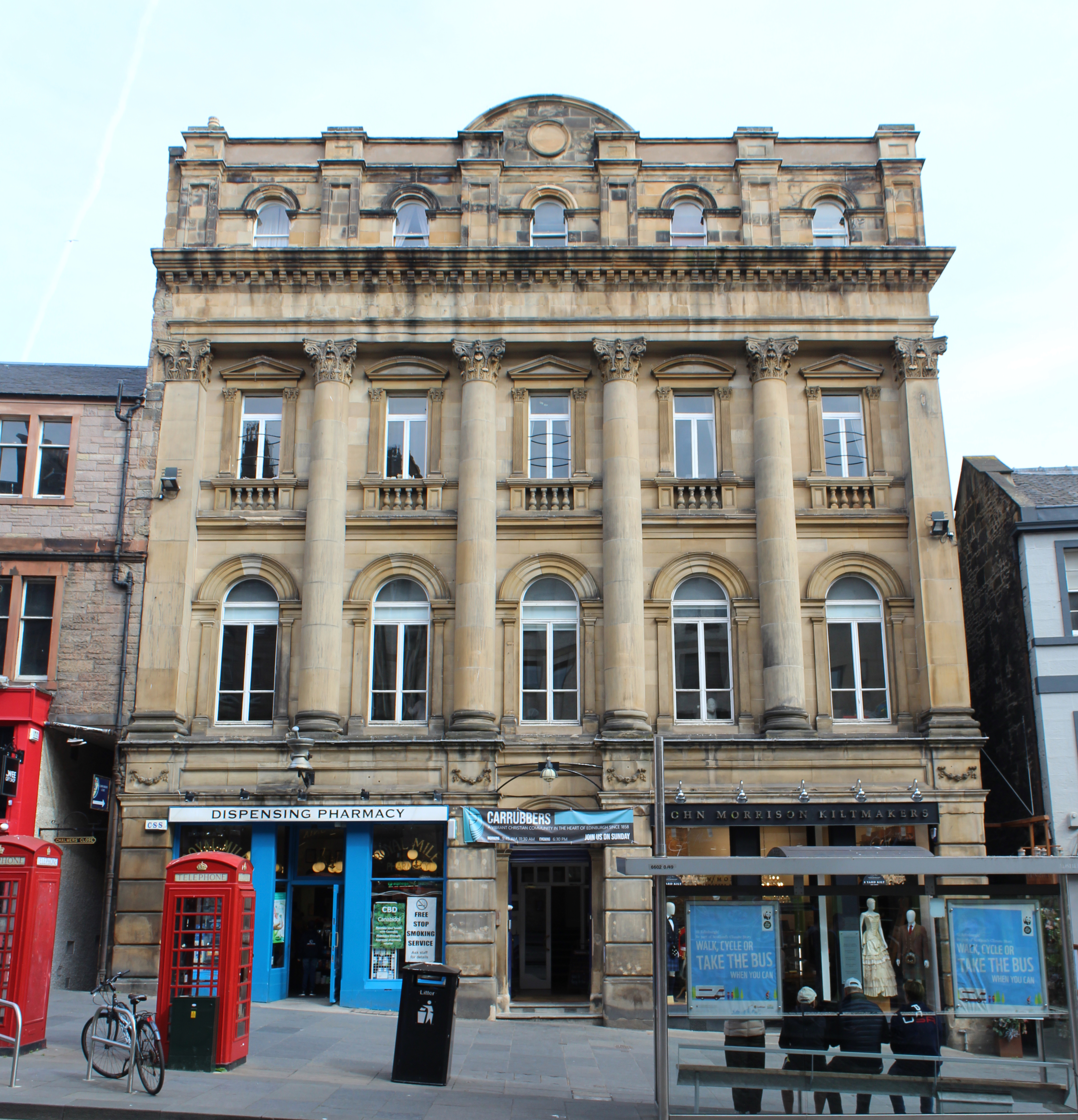
Carrubbers Close Mission

- Easy Guide to the Constellations (1870)
- People's Atlas of the Stars
- Handbook to Astronomy
- "Use of Cylindrical Projections for Geographical, Astronomical and Scientific Purposes". Scottish Geographical Magazine. Vol. 1, no. 4. Edinburgh. April 1885. pp. 119–23.
- Primeeval Man Unveiled: or The Anthropology of the Bible
- The Science of Missions
- The Synagogue as the Model of the Christian Church
- Catechism of Christian Baptism
- Dipping not Baptism
- The evangelistic baptism indispensable to the Church for the conversion of the world (1878)
- Good Friday: A Chronological Mistake (1882)
- Home Missions: The People's Work
- Revival of Pentecostal Christianity
- Where the Morisonians Are Wrong

== Family ==
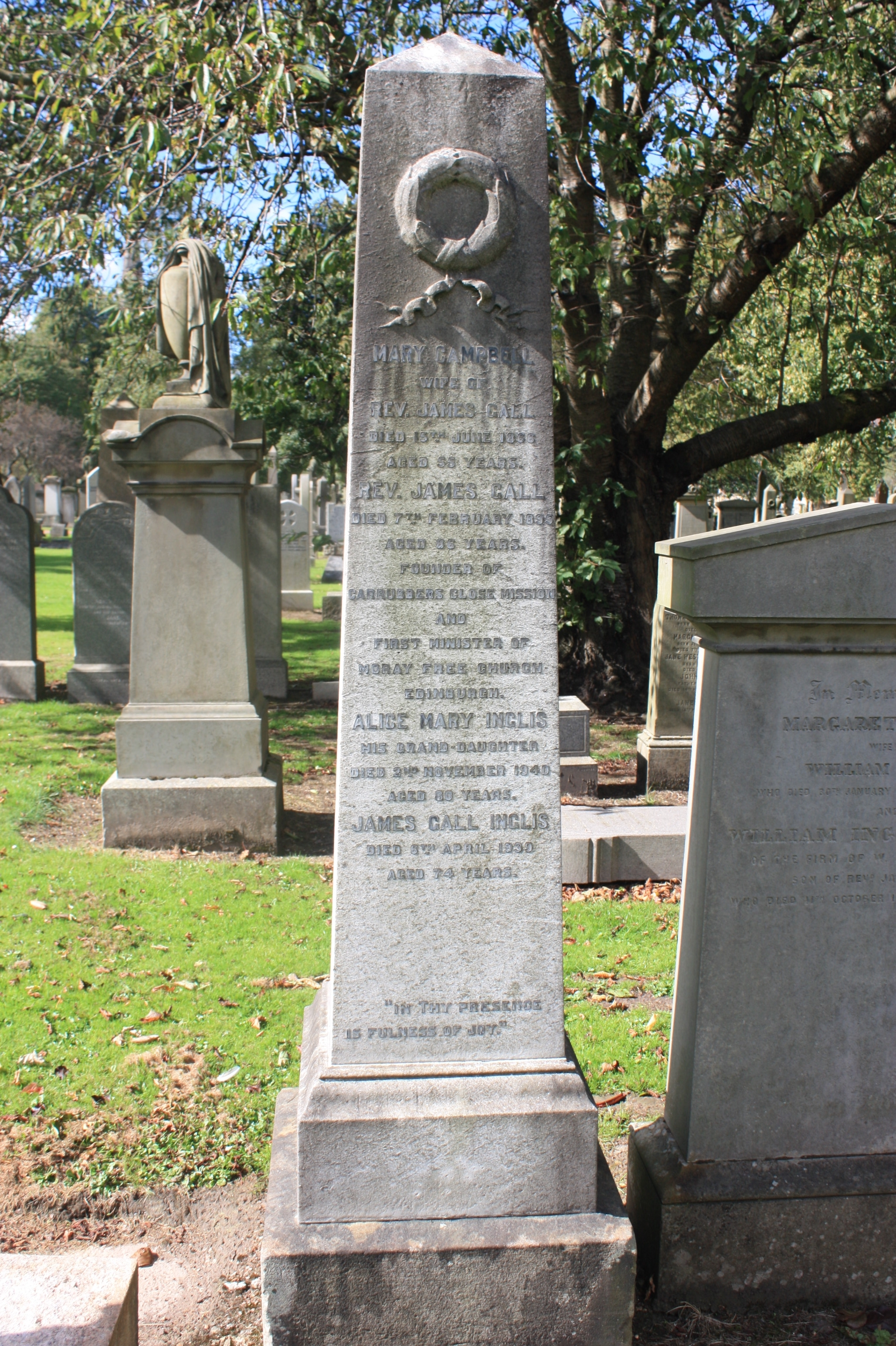
James Gall's grave, Grange Cemetery

Gall's father, James Gall (1784–1874), designed a "triangular alphabet" used for embossed books for blind people and was instrumental in founding the Royal Blind School in Edinburgh. He was also the principal creator of the Scottish Sunday School system.

In 1833 Gall married Mary Campbell from Belfast (1810-1866). Their eldest son, James Gall (b.1834) became a businessman in Jamaica. Their daughter, Elizabeth ("Eliza") Walkingshaw Gall (1835-1912), married Robert Inglis, the son of James Gall's business partner, who then inherited the printing company of Gall & Inglis on James's death. Robert's son, James Gall Inglis FRSE (1865–1939) was also a keen astronomer and came to the firm in 1880. He is buried with James Gall. Anna Gall (1838-1929) died a spinster.
