= Nicolas Auguste Tissot =

French cartographer (1824–1907)

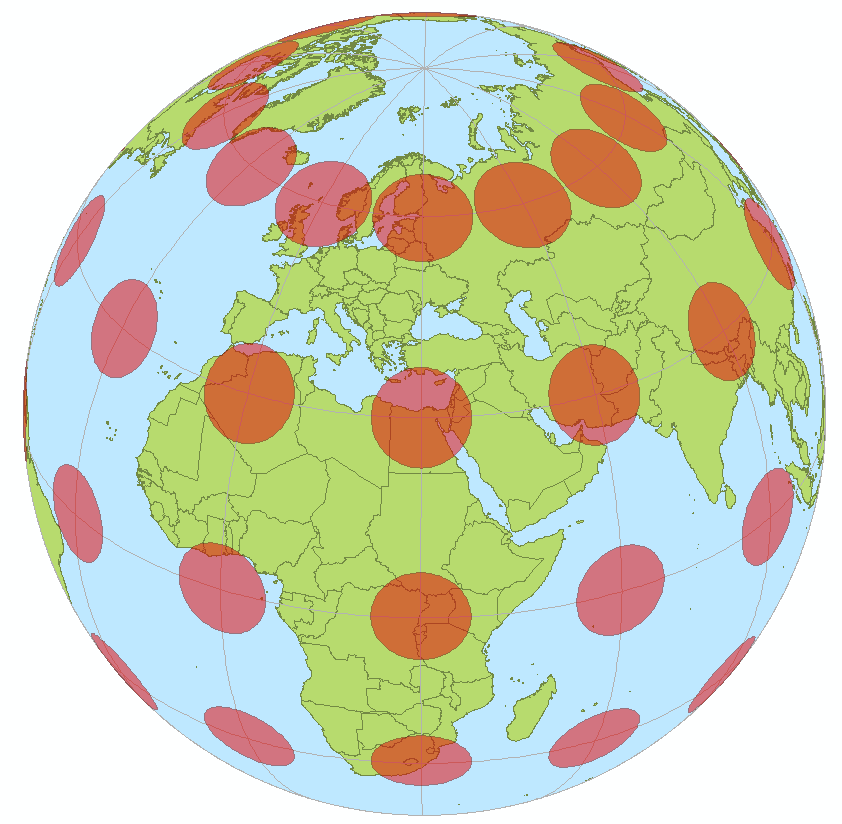
Tissot's indicatrices viewed on a sphere: all are identical circles

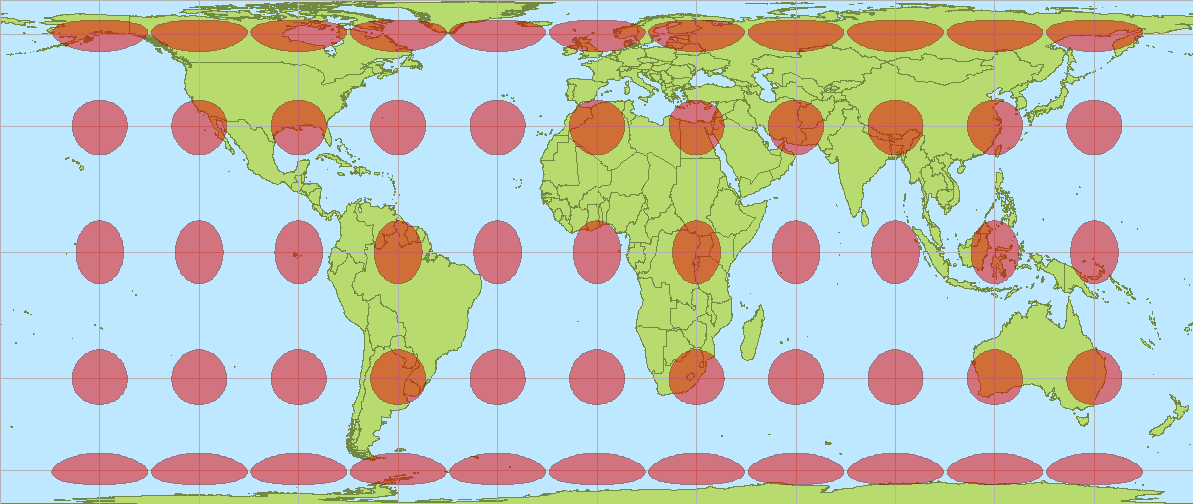
The Behrmann projection with Tissot's indicatrices

The indicatrices demonstrate the difference between the 3D world as seen from space and 2D projections of its surface

Nicolas Auguste Tissot (English: /tiːˈsoʊ/ tee-SOH, French: [nikɔla ogyst tiso]; March 16, 1824 – July 14, 1907) was a French cartographer, who in 1859 and 1881 published an analysis of the distortion that occurs on map projections. He devised Tissot's indicatrix, or distortion circle, which when plotted on a map will appear as an ellipse whose elongation depends on the amount of distortion by the map at that point. The angle and extent of the elongation represents the amount of angular distortion of the map. The size of the ellipse indicates the amount that the area is distorted.

== Biography ==
Born in Nancy, Meurthe, France, Tissot was trained as an engineer in the French Army, from which he graduated as capitaine du génie. In the early 1860s he became an instructor in geodesy at the well-reputed Ecole Polytechnique in Paris. Around the same time, he indulged a research program meant to determine the best way of cartographic projection for a particular region and presented his findings to the French Académie des Sciences.

In the eighteenth century, the German cartographer Johann H. Lambert had enunciated a mathematical theory of map projections and of the attendant characteristics of distortions that any given projection involved. Carl Friedrich Gauss had also studied the subject before Tissot's contributions later in the nineteenth century.

Tissot's research in the mid-1850s on methods for finding good projections for particular regions led him to develop a projection that he saw as optimal. While not quite equal-area or conformal, his projection resulted in "negligible distortion for a very small region." Subsequently, his optimal projection was adopted by the geographic service of the French Army. While his first concepts regarding cartographic distortions developed in mid-century, it was only with the publication of Mémoire sur la représentation des surfaces et les projections des cartes géographiques in 1881 that the Tissot's Indicatrix became popular. In the book, Tissot argued for his method, reportedly demonstrating that "whatever the system of transformation, there is at each point on the spherical surface at least one pair of orthogonal directions which will also be orthogonal on the projection."

Tissot employed a graphical device he called the ellipse indicatrice or distortion circle. When plotted on a map it reveals the amount of distortion by the map at the particular point where the ellipse is plotted. He suggested that the angle and extent of the elongation of the distortion circle represented the amount of angular distortion of the map, while the size of the ellipse corresponded to the amount of distortion in area.

In a nineteenth-century cartographic context, in which professionals looked for ways to apply mathematical principles to the science of mapping and the map projection, Tissot's theory was favorably received, at least in continental Europe. Even in the more restrained Anglo-American academic world, a columnist of Science, a publication sponsored by the American Association for the Advancement of Science, hailed Tissot's method and encouraged his readers to study his work in the hope that such a study "will lead to the adoption of better projections than those which are at present in use." The legacy of Tissot’s method is still vivid today, as suggested by the authors of Map Projections for Europe, who argue that since Tissot’s famous analysis regarding distortion, the only major scientific development in the metric interpretation of deformation has been Eduard Imhof's Verzerrungsgitter, or deformation grid.

Tissot died in Voreppe, Isère on July 14, 1907.
