= Arno Peters =

German historian and filmmaker (1916–2002)

- Born: 22 May 1916; Berlin, German Empire
- Died: 2 December 2002 (aged 86); Bremen, Germany
- Education: Friedrich-Wilhelm University
- Occupations: Historian; Director of the Institute for Universal History
- Known for: Developing the Peters world map based on the Gall-Peters projection
- Honors: Honorary professorship at the University of Bremen

Peters world map

Arno Peters (22 May 1916 – 2 December 2002) was a German historian who developed the Peters world map, based on the Gall–Peters projection.

== Biography ==
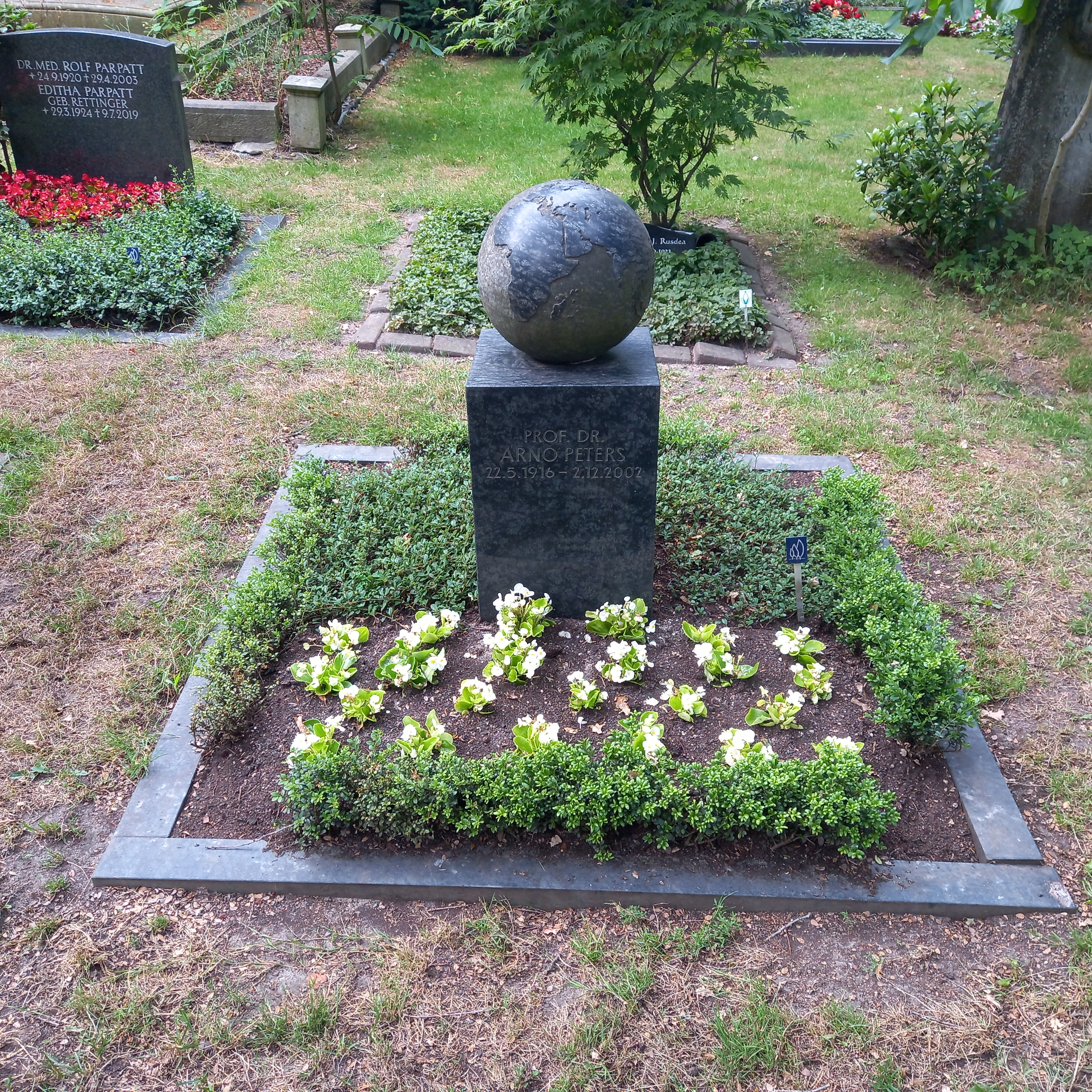
Grave of Arno Peters in Bremen, Germany

Peters was born in Berlin. In childhood he lived in Berlin, Germany, with his brother, Werner and his parents Lucy and Bruno. The family often entertained foreign guests, and he was exposed to social activism because of his parents' role in the labor union movement. His father was briefly incarcerated by the Nazi regime toward the end of World War II. Peters competed as both a cyclist and a swimmer in high school, receiving titles in both.

After attaining his doctorate from the Friedrich-Wilhelm University in history of art and journalism in 1945, Peters began his academic research of synchronoptic world history. This topic was introduced to him during college and formed a large part of his dissertation, titled Film as a Means of Public Leadership. Though Peters discussed his world map as early as 1967, he did not start promoting it until a press conference in Bonn in May 1973.

In 1974 Peters founded the Institute for Universal History in Bremen, Germany, where he served as director. He was awarded an honorary professorship by the University of Bremen and worked in Bremen until his death on 2 December 2002. Peters is buried in a cemetery in the city, and his black marble gravestone is a plinth with a globe on top.

== Work ==
Spurred by his interest in political propaganda, he spent much of his academic life studying synchronoptic world history, which focuses on all areas of the world equally. Out of these studies came his "synchronoptic world history" timeline, devoting the same space to all areas and times of the world simultaneously, spanning 1000 BC to 1952 AD, based on the theory that viewing all civilizations and countries concurrently shows relationships and influences that might not otherwise be obvious. Published in 1952, it presaged his world map. In these activities Peters developed a belief in the Eurocentric bias of most maps. Since he could not find a map that satisfied him, Peters developed one himself. In 1974 he announced the Peters world map, claiming it was the most accurate representation of the world. The map engendered controversy. The map projection Peters claimed to have developed had been presented more than a century earlier by the Reverend James Gall, and, despite Peters's claims, the projection was not the first or only equal-area projection. Many other of his claims were disputed or debunked. Despite criticism, over 80 million of Peters's maps have been distributed worldwide. In 1989 Peters published The Peters Atlas of the World, which at the time was the only atlas that represented all areas on about the same scale.

== See also ==
- Meridian 11°15' East
