= Walter Behrmann =

German geographer (1882–1955)

Walter Emmerich Behrmann (May 22, 1882, Oldenburg – May 3, 1955, Berlin) was a German geographer. He is remembered for introducing a cylindrical map projection known as the "Behrmann projection".

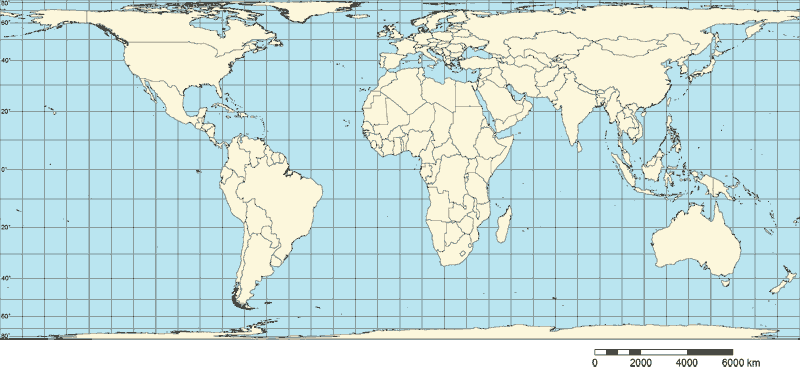
Map of the World in Behrmann projection

== Biography ==
From 1901 to 1905, he studied geography, mathematics and physics at the University of Göttingen, where he was a student of Hermann Wagner. Later on, he worked as an assistant to geographer Joseph Partsch at the University of Leipzig (1908/09). In 1912/13 he participated as a geographer in the Kaiserin-Augusta-Fluss Expedition to New Guinea along with Richard Thurnwald.

In 1918 he was appointed director of the Landeskundliche Kommission in Romania. In 1922 he was named an associate professor of cartography at the University of Berlin, and afterwards was a professor of geography at Frankfurt University (from 1923) and at the Free University of Berlin (from 1948). In 1954 he attained "professor emeritus" status.

== Selected works ==
- Über die niederdeutschen Seebücher des fünfzehnten und sechzehnten Jahrhunderts, 1906 (doctoral thesis).
- Nach Deutsch-Neuguinea, 1914.
- Der Sepik (Kaiserin-Augusta-Fluss) und sein Stromgebiet, 1917.
- Im Stromgebiet des Sepik, eine deutsche Forschungsreise in Neuguinea, 1922.
- Das westliche Kaiser-Wilhelms-Land in Neu-Guinea, 1924.
- Rhein-Mainischer Atlas für Wirtschaft, Verwaltung und Unterricht, 1929 (with Otto Maull).
- Aufgaben der Kolonialkartographie, 1936.
- Die Entschleierung der Erde, 1948.
