= Behrmann projection =

Cylindrical equal-area map projection

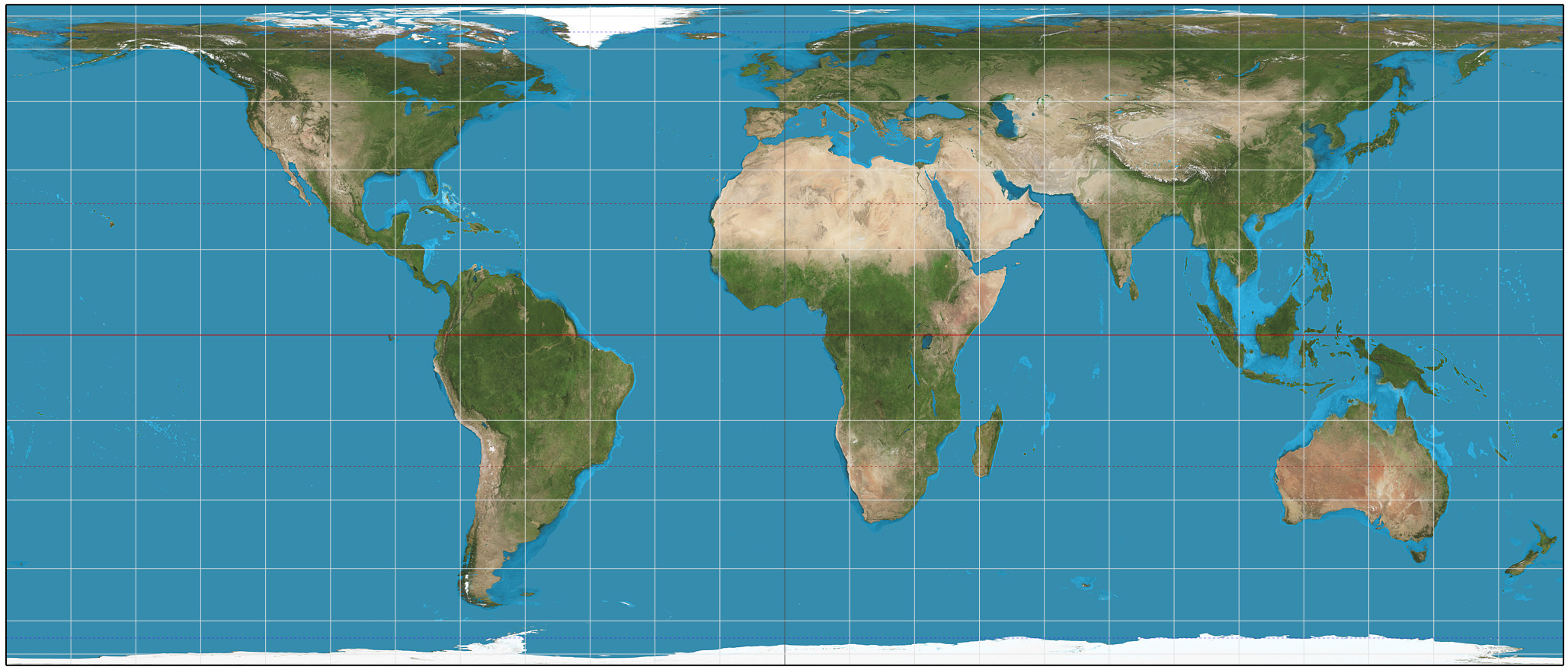
Behrmann projection of the world

The Behrmann cylindrical equal-area projection with Tissot's indicatrices of deformation

The Behrmann projection is a cylindrical equal-area map projection described by Walter Behrmann in 1910. Cylindrical equal-area projections differ by their standard parallels, which are parallels along which the projection has no distortion. In the case of the Behrmann projection, the standard parallels are 30°N and 30°S. While equal-area, distortion of shape increases in the Behrmann projection according to distance from the standard parallels. The Behrmann projection has the property that half of the Earth's surface is stretched horizontally and the other half is stretched vertically. This projection is not equidistant.

== See also ==
- List of map projections
