= Collignon =

Collignon is a surname, and may refer to:

- Charles Collignon (fencer), French fencer and 1908 Olympic champion
- Charles Collignon (surgeon) (1725–1785), British surgeon and professor of anatomy at Cambridge University
- Christophe Collignon (b. 1969), Belgian politician
- Claude Boniface Collignon (d. 1819), French proponent of decimal time and metric system
- Daphné Collignon (born 1977), French comic book author
- Édouard Collignon (1831–1913), French engineer and scientist
- François Collignon (c. 1609–1687), French engraver
- Frédéric Collignon (b. 1975), Belgian table football player
- Giuseppe Collignon (1778–1863), Italian neoclassical painter
- Jacques Collignon (1936–2026), French Olympic swimmer
- Jean Nicolas Collignon (1762–?1788), French botanist
- Maurice Collignon (1893–1978), French geologist and paleontologist
- Maxime Collignon (1849–1917), French archaeologist
- Médéric Collignon (born 1970), French musician

== See also ==
- Collignon projection, pseudocylindrical map projection first known to be published by Édouard Collignon in 1865
