= Trimetric =

Trimetric may refer to:

- Trimetric projection, one of 3 types of axonometric projection
- Chamberlin trimetric projection, a type of map projection
- Trimetric Classic or Three Character Classic, a Chinese text from the 13th century

== See also ==
- Trimeter
