= Equidistant conic projection =

Conic equidistant map projection

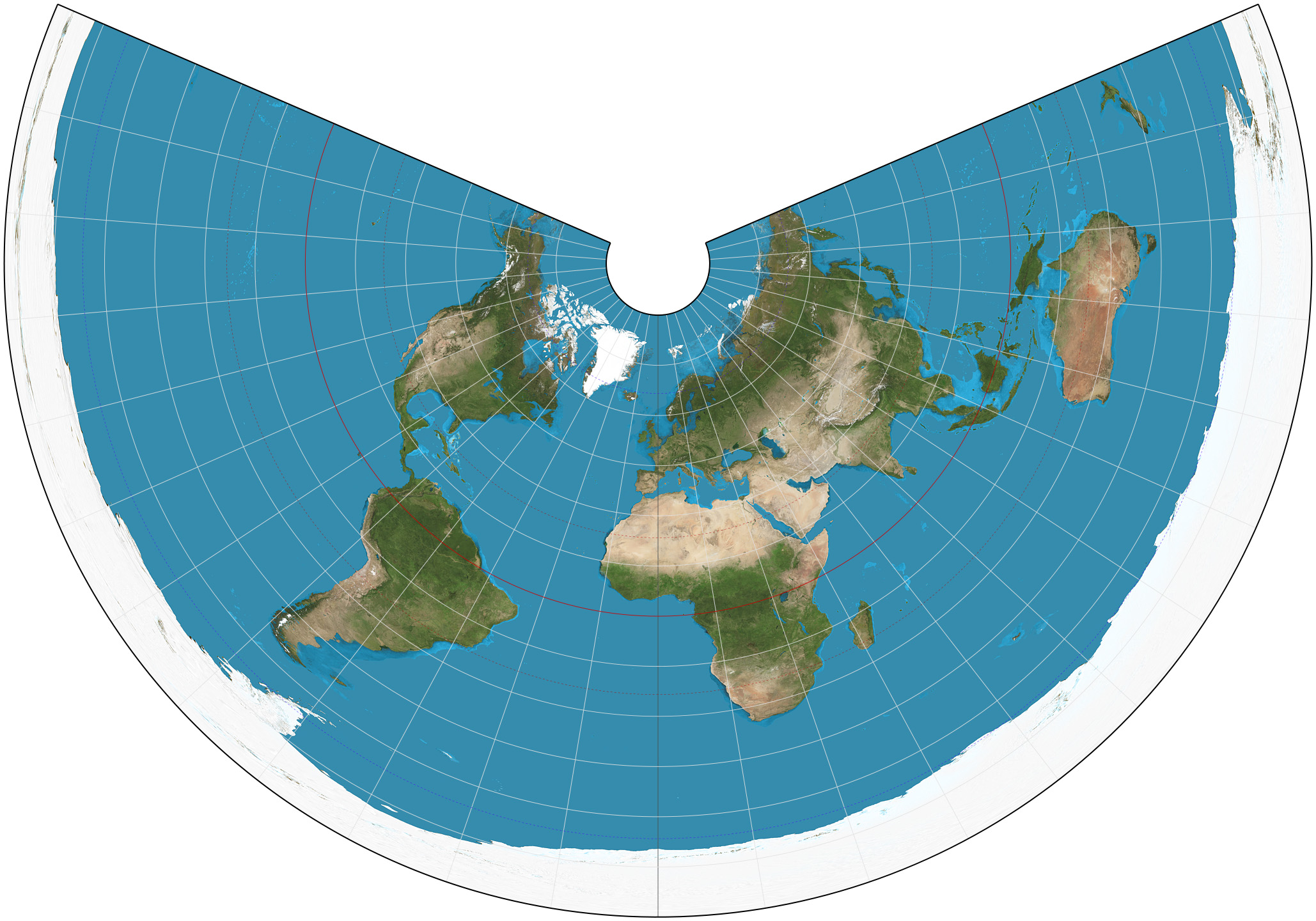
The world on an equidistant conic projection. 15° graticule, standard parallels of 20°N and 60°N.

The equidistant conic projection with Tissot's indicatrix of deformation. Standard parallels of 15°N and 45°N.

The equidistant conic projection is a conic map projection commonly used for maps of small countries as well as for larger regions such as the continental United States that are elongated east-to-west.

Also known as the simple conic projection, a rudimentary version was described during the 2nd century CE by the Greek astronomer and geographer Ptolemy in his work Geography.

The projection has the useful property that distances along the meridians are proportionately correct, and distances are also correct along two standard parallels that the mapmaker has chosen. The two standard parallels are also free of distortion.

For maps of regions elongated east-to-west (such as the continental United States) the standard parallels are chosen to be about a sixth of the way inside the northern and southern limits of interest. This way distortion is minimized throughout the region of interest.

== Transformation ==
Coordinates from a spherical datum can be transformed to an equidistant conic projection with rectangular coordinates by using the following formulas, where λ is the longitude, λ_{0} the reference longitude, φ the latitude, φ_{0} the reference latitude, and φ_{1} and φ_{2} the standard parallels:
$$\begin{align}
x &= \rho \sin\left[n \left(\lambda - \lambda_0\right)\right] \\
y &= \rho_0 - \rho \cos\left[n \left(\lambda - \lambda_0\right)\right]
\end{align}$$
where
$$\rho = (G - \varphi)$$
$$\rho_0 = (G - \varphi_0)$$
$$G = \frac {\cos{\varphi_1}}{n} + \varphi_1$$
$$n = \frac {\cos{\varphi_1} - \cos{\varphi_2}}{\varphi_2 - \varphi_1}$$

Constants n, G, and ρ_{0} need only be determined once for the entire map. If one standard parallel is used (i.e. φ_{1} = φ_{2}), the formula for n above is indeterminate, but then
$$n = \sin{\varphi_1}$$

The reference point (λ_{0}, φ_{0}) with longitude λ_{0} and latitude φ_{0}, transforms to the x,y origin at (0,0) in the rectangular coordinate system.

The Y axis maps the central meridian λ_{0}, with y increasing northwards, which is orthogonal to the X axis mapping the central parallel φ_{0}, with x increasing eastwards.

Other versions of these transformation formulae include parameters to offset the map coordinates so that all x,y values are positive, as well as a scaling parameter relating the radius of the sphere (Earth) to the units used on the map.

The formulae used for ellipsoidal datums are more involved.

== See also ==
- List of map projections

== Sources ==
- Snyder, John P. (1987). Map Projections - A Working Manual (PDF) (Report). USGS Professional Paper 1395. U.S. Geological Survey. Archived from the original (PDF) on 3 January 2020.
- Snyder, John P. (1993). Flattening the Earth: 2000 Years of Map Projections. University of Chicago Press. ISBN 0226767469.
