= Two-point equidistant projection =

Two-point equidistant map projection

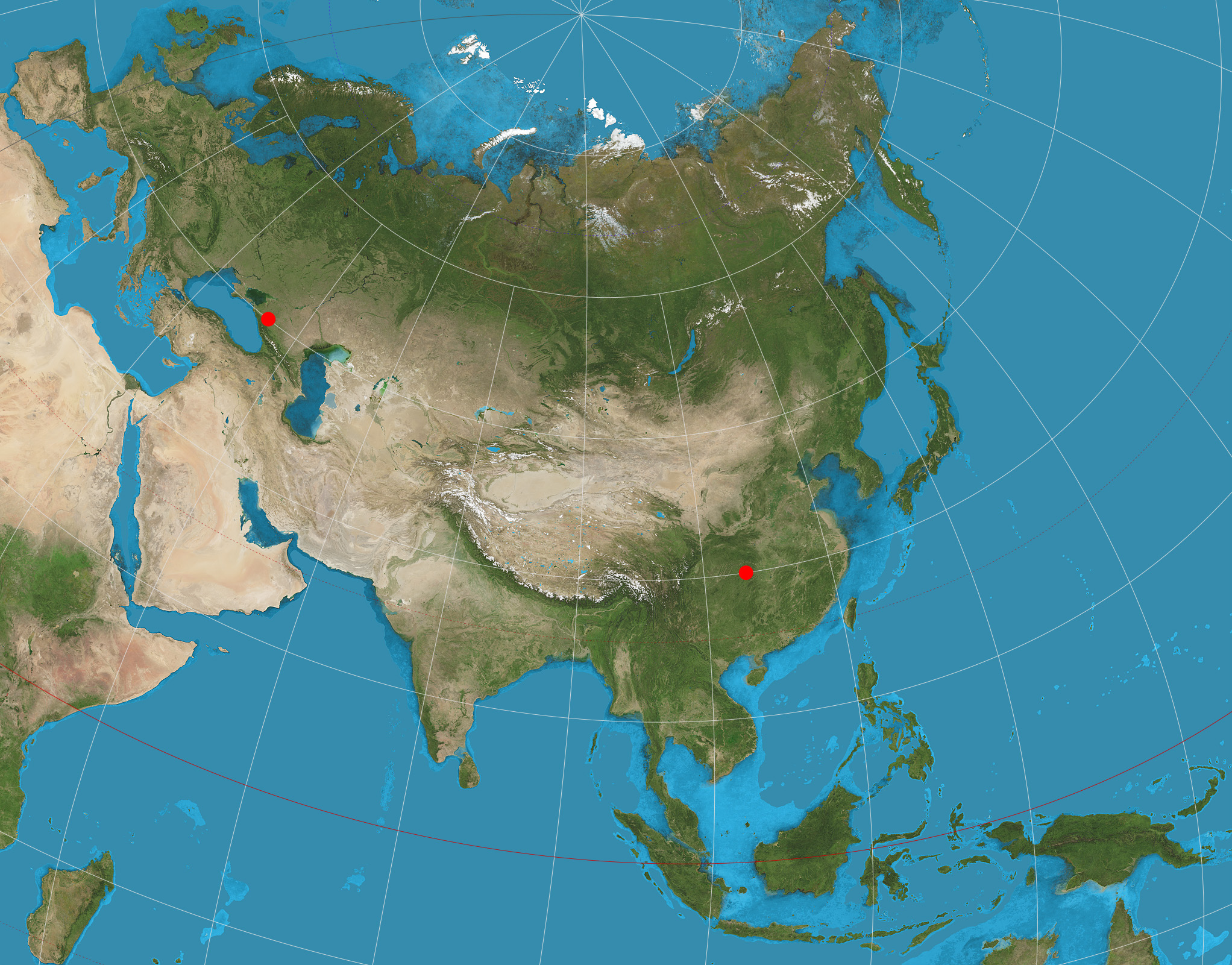
Two-point equidistant projection of Eurasia. All distances are correct from the two points (45°N, 40°E) and (30°N, 110°E).

Two-point equidistant projection of the entire world with Tissot's indicatrix of deformation. The two points are Rome and Luoyang.

The two-point equidistant projection or doubly equidistant projection is a map projection first described by Hans Maurer in 1919 and Charles Close in 1921. It is a generalization of the much simpler azimuthal equidistant projection. In this two-point form, two locus points are chosen by the mapmaker to configure the projection. Distances from the two loci to any other point on the map are correct: that is, they scale to the distances of the same points on the sphere.

The two-point equidistant projection maps a family of confocal spherical conics onto two families of planar ellipses and hyperbolas.

The projection has been used for all maps of the Asian continent by the National Geographic Society atlases since 1959, though its purpose in that case was to reduce distortion throughout Asia rather than to measure from the two loci. The projection sometimes appears in maps of air routes. The Chamberlin trimetric projection is a logical extension of the two-point idea to three points, but the three-point case only yields a sort of minimum error for distances from the three loci, rather than yielding correct distances. Tobler extended this idea to arbitrarily large number of loci by using automated root-mean-square minimization techniques rather than using closed-form formulae.

The projection can be generalized to an ellipsoid of revolution by using geodesic distance.

== See also ==
- List of map projections
- Chamberlin trimetric projection
- 3D projection
