= Graticule =

Grid on a map, depicting a coordinate system

Map of Europe with a 30° graticule in dark gray

A graticule or grid (from Latin crāticula 'grill/grating'), on a map, is a graphical depiction of a coordinate system as a grid of coordinate curves or "lines", each curve/line representing a constant coordinate value. It is thus a form of isoline, and is commonly found on maps of many kinds, at scales from local to global.

The term graticule is almost always used to specifically refer to the parallels and meridians of latitude and longitude, respectively. In modern usage, graticules are contrasted with grids, which display the eastings and northings of a projected coordinate reference system, such as Universal Transverse Mercator – usually the coordinate system in which the map is drawn.

Some cartographers have used the term "graticule" to refer not only to the visual lines, but to the system of latitude and longitude reference itself; however, in the era of geographic information systems, it is more common to call this the geographic coordinate system.

== Uses and design ==
The graticule may serve several purposes on a map:

- Aid map users in estimating the coordinates of locations
- Aid map users in identifying locations with known coordinates
- Indicate the cardinal directions, especially on map projections in which these directions vary across the map (e.g. conic, pseudocylindrical, azimuthal) where a north arrow or compass rose would not be appropriate

These are usually secondary to the main purpose of the map, so graticules are often drawn to be relatively low in the visual hierarchy.

== History ==
1482 reproduction of the world map in the Geography of Claudius Ptolemy

The graticule is of ancient origin, being almost as old as the concept of the spherical Earth, coordinate system for measuring geographic locations, and the map projection. Strabo, in his Geography (ca 20 AD), states that the maps in Eratosthenes's Geography Book 3 (3rd century BC, now lost) contained lines "drawn from west to east, parallel to the equatorial line" (thus the term parallel) Ptolemy's Geography (ca 150 AD) gives detailed instructions for drawing the parallels and meridians for his two projections.

The works of Ptolemy and other classical geographers were available to the scientists of medieval Islam. Some, such as al-Khwarizmi, further developed these works, including creating maps on a graticule of latitude and longitude.

During the European Middle Ages, graticules disappeared from the few maps that were produced; T and O maps in particular were more concerned with religious cosmology than accurate representation of location. The portolan charts of the 13th to 15th centuries were much more accurate, but used rhumb lines that were much more useful for sea navigation than latitude and longitude. At the same time, however, the rediscovery of Ptolemy and other classical knowledge of the shape and size of the Earth led to the recreation of some of the ancient maps with their graticules; the earliest extant copies of Ptolemy's Geography with his maps date to the 14th and 15th centuries. Starting in the 16th century, the graticule has been ubiquitous on global and continental scale maps.

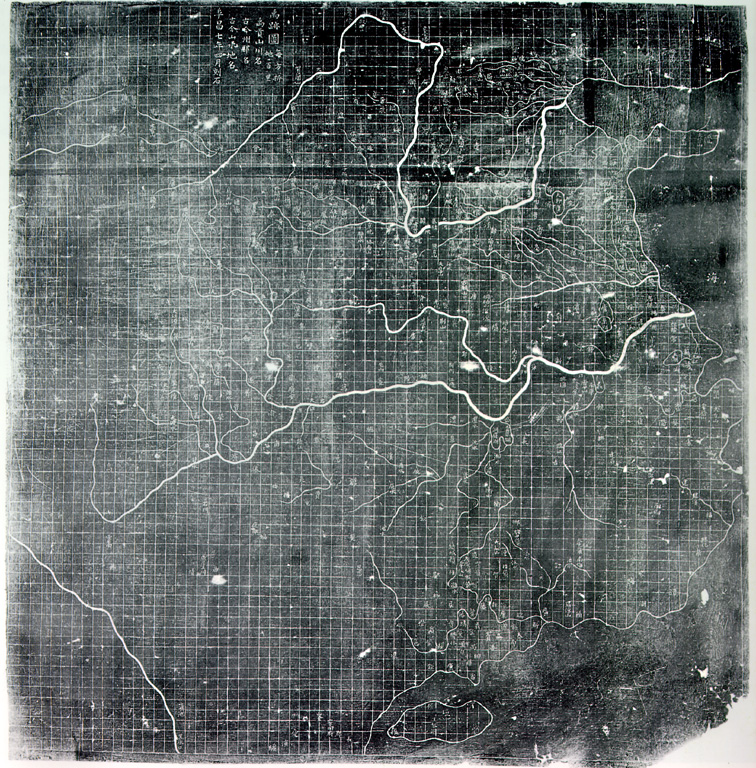
The Song-dynasty (12th-century) Yu Ji Tu map, based on a grid with a 100 li (about 30 mile) spacing.

There is some debate over whether the Chinese and other Asians knew the world to be spherical prior to Western contact, but most maps appear to assume regions as flat. Although Chinese maps do not portray any concept of latitude and longitude, Cartesian grids appear on some maps dating back to the 11th century.

== See also ==
- Projected coordinate system
