= Albers projection =

Conic equal-area map projection

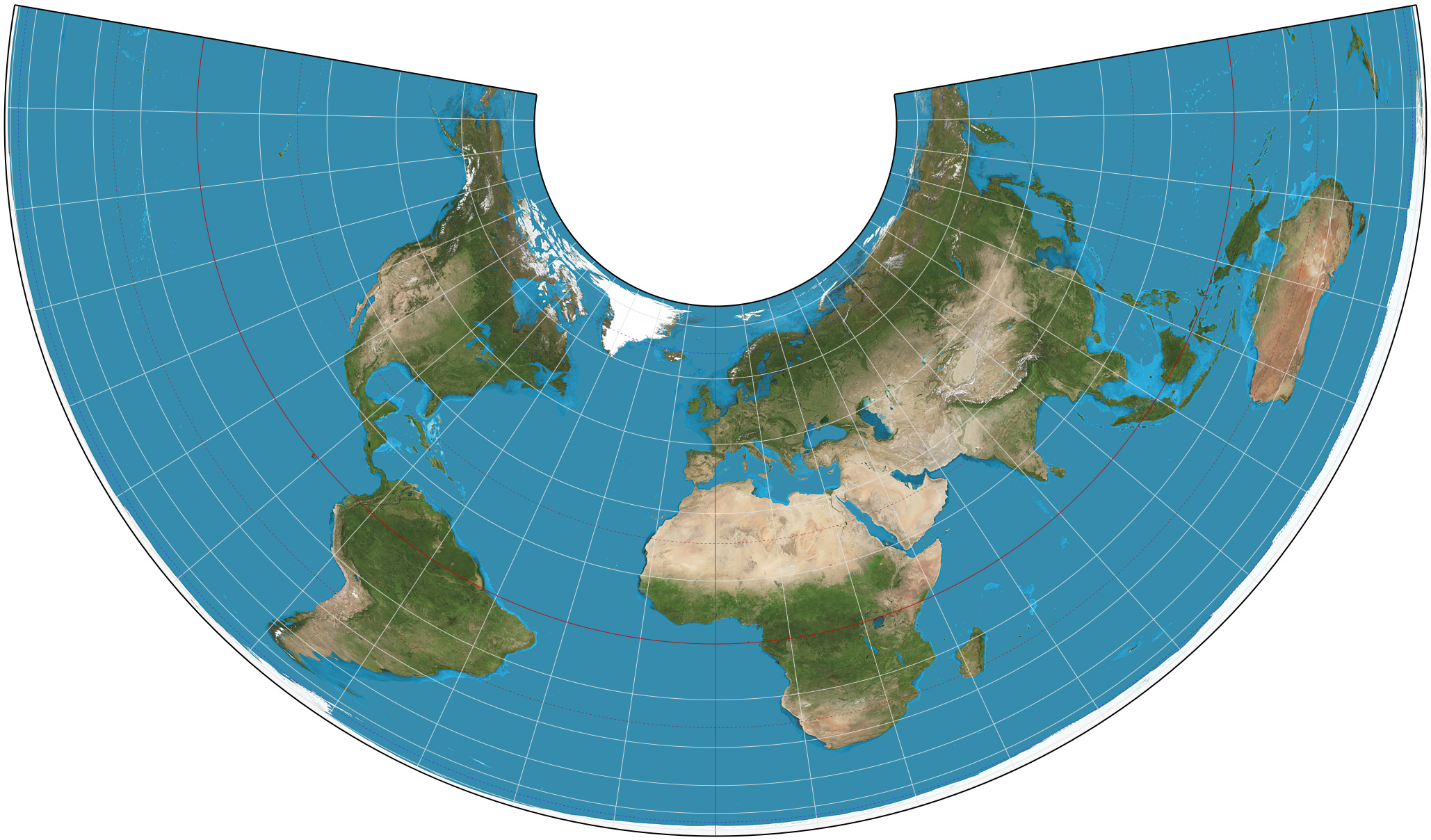
Albers projection of the world with standard parallels 20°N and 50°N

The Albers projection with standard parallels 15°N and 45°N, with Tissot's indicatrix of deformation

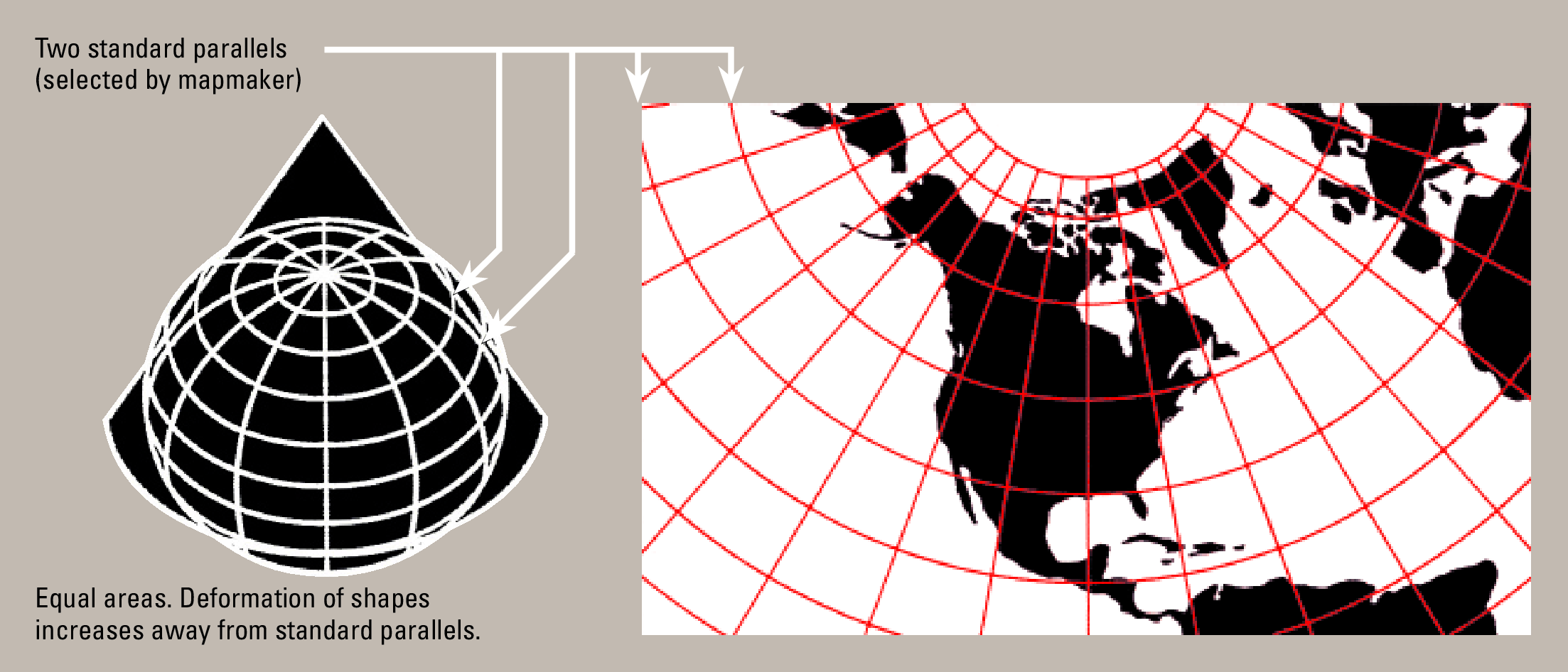
An Albers projection shows areas accurately, but distorts shapes.

The Albers equal-area conic projection, or Albers projection, is a conic, equal area map projection that uses two standard parallels. Although scale and shape are not preserved, distortion is minimal between the standard parallels. It was first described by Heinrich Christian Albers (1773-1833) in a German geography and astronomy periodical in 1805.

== Official adoption ==
The Albers projection is used by some big countries as "official standard projection" for Census and other applications.

| Country | Agency |
|---|---|
| Brazil | federal government, through IBGE, for Census Statistical Grid |
| Canada | government of British Columbia |
| Canada | government of the Yukon (sole governmental projection) |
| US | United States Geological Survey |
| US | United States Census Bureau |

Some "official products" also adopted Albers projection, for example most of the maps in the National Atlas of the United States.

== Formulas ==
=== For sphere ===
Snyder describes generating formulae for the projection, as well as the projection's characteristics. Coordinates from a spherical datum can be transformed into Albers equal-area conic projection coordinates with the following formulas, where ${R}$ is the radius, $\lambda$ is the longitude, $\lambda_0$ the reference longitude, $\varphi$ the latitude, $\varphi_0$ the reference latitude and $\varphi_1$ and $\varphi_2$ the standard parallels:
$$\begin{align}
x &= \rho \sin\theta, \\
y &= \rho_0 - \rho \cos\theta,
\end{align}$$
where
$$\begin{align}
n &= \tfrac12 (\sin\varphi_1 + \sin\varphi_2), \\
\theta &= n (\lambda - \lambda_0), \\
C &= \cos^2 \varphi_1 + 2 n \sin \varphi_1, \\
\rho &= \tfrac{R}{n} \sqrt{C - 2 n \sin \varphi}, \\
\rho_0 &= \tfrac{R}{n} \sqrt{C - 2 n \sin \varphi_0}.
\end{align}$$

=== Lambert equal-area conic ===
If just one of the two standard parallels of the Albers projection is placed on a pole, the result is the Lambert equal-area conic projection.

== See also ==
- List of map projections
