= Tobler hyperelliptical projection =

Pseudocylindrical equal-area map projection

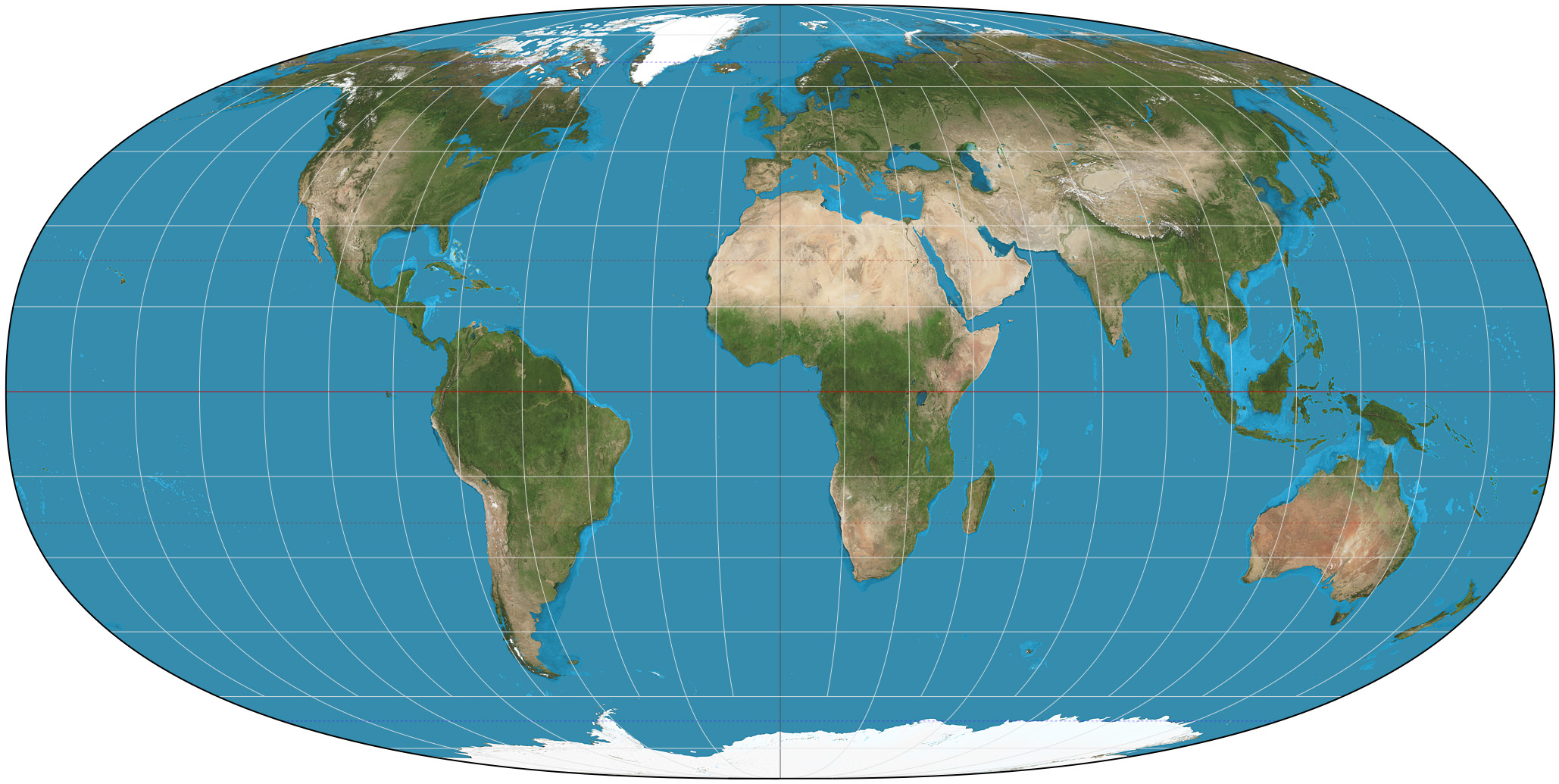
Tobler hyperelliptical projection of the world; α = 0, γ = 1.18314, k = 2.5

The Tobler hyperelliptical projection with Tissot's indicatrix of deformation; α = 0, k = 3

The Tobler hyperelliptical projection is a family of equal-area pseudocylindrical projections that may be used for world maps. Waldo R. Tobler introduced the construction in 1973 as the hyperelliptical projection, now usually known as the Tobler hyperelliptical projection.

== Overview ==
As with any pseudocylindrical projection, in the projection's normal aspect, the parallels of latitude are parallel, straight lines. Their spacing is calculated to provide the equal-area property. The projection blends the cylindrical equal-area projection, which has straight, vertical meridians, with meridians that follow a particular kind of curve known as superellipses or Lamé curves or sometimes as hyperellipses. A hyperellipse is described by $x^k + y^k = \gamma^k$, where $\gamma$ and $k$ are free parameters. Tobler's hyperelliptical projection is given as:
$$\begin{align}
&x = \lambda \left[\alpha + (1 - \alpha) \frac{\left(\gamma^k - y^k\right)^{1/k}}{\gamma}\right] \\
\alpha &y = \sin \varphi + \frac{\alpha - 1}{\gamma} \int_0^y \left(\gamma^k - z^k\right)^{1/k} dz
\end{align}$$
where $\lambda$ is the longitude, $\varphi$ is the latitude, and $\alpha$ is the relative weight given to the cylindrical equal-area projection. For a purely cylindrical equal-area, $\alpha = 1$; for a projection with pure hyperellipses for meridians, $\alpha = 0$; and for weighted combinations, $0 < \alpha < 1$.

When $\alpha = 0$ and $k = 1$ the projection degenerates to the Collignon projection; when $\alpha = 0$, $k = 2$, and $\gamma = 4 / \pi$ the projection becomes the Mollweide projection. Tobler favored the parameterization shown with the top illustration; that is, $\alpha = 0$, $k = 2.5$, and $\gamma \approx 1.183136$.

== See also ==
- List of map projections
