= Collignon projection =

Pseudocylindrical equal-area map projection

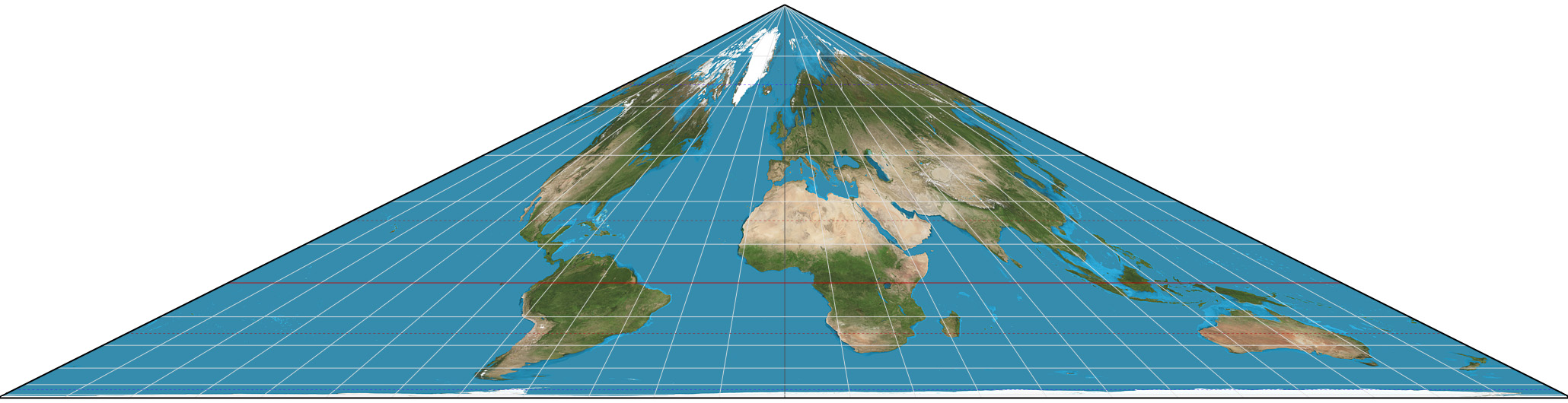
Collignon projection of the world.

The Collignon projection is an equal-area pseudocylindrical map projection first known to be published by Édouard Collignon in 1865 and subsequently cited by A. Tissot in 1881.

For the smallest choices of the parameters chosen for this projection, the sphere may be mapped either to a single diamond, a pair of squares, or a triangle. The projection is used in the polar areas as part of the HEALPix spherical projection, which is widely used in physical cosmology in making maps of the cosmic microwave background, in particular by the WMAP and Planck space missions.

== Formulae ==
Let R be the radius of the sphere, φ the latitude, λ the longitude, and λ_{0} the longitude of the central meridian (chosen as desired). Also, define $s = \sqrt{1 - \sin \phi} = {}$$\sqrt{2} \sin\left(\frac{\pi}{4} - \frac{\phi}{2}\right)$, where the two forms are equivalent for φ in the range of possible latitudes. Then the Collignon projection is given by:
$$\begin{align}
x &= \frac{2}{\sqrt{\pi}}R \left( \lambda - \lambda_0 \right) s, \\
y &= \sqrt{\pi} R \left( 1 - s \right).
\end{align}$$
This formula gives the projection as pictured above, coming to a point at the North Pole. For a projection coming to a point at the South Pole, as in the bottom portion of the HEALPix projection, replace φ and y with −φ and −y. The standard parallel is 15°51′N.

== See also ==
- List of map projections
- Tobler hyperelliptical projection family
