= Chamberlin trimetric projection =

Type of map projection

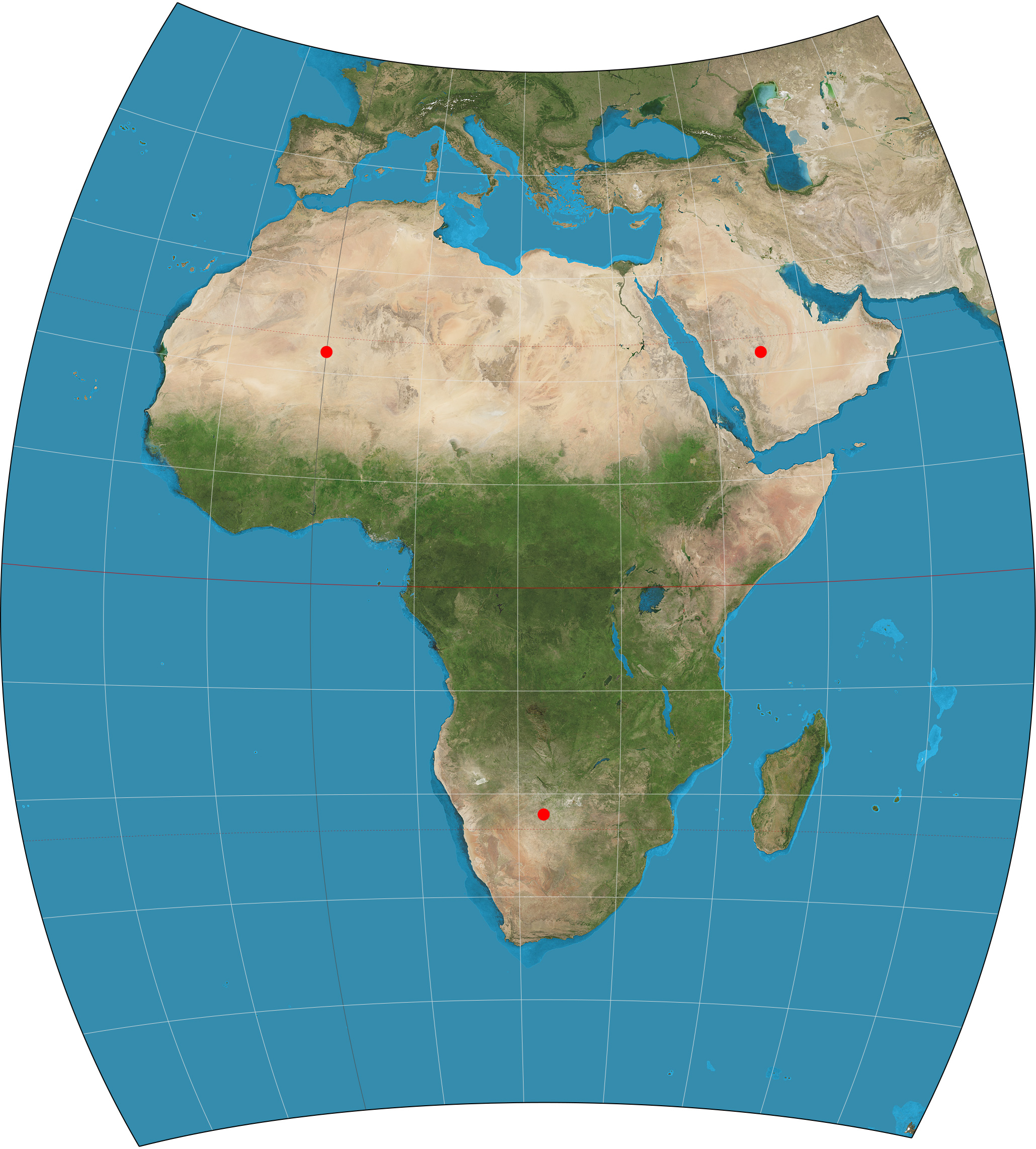
A map of Africa using the Chamberlin trimetric projection. The three red dots indicate the selected "base" locations: (22°N, 0°), (22°N, 45°E), (22°S, 22.5°E). 10° graticule.

The Chamberlin trimetric projection is a map projection where three points are fixed on the globe and the points on the sphere are mapped onto a plane by triangulation. It was developed in 1946 by Wellman Chamberlin for the National Geographic Society. Chamberlin was chief cartographer for the Society from 1964 to 1971. The projection's principal feature is that it compromises between distortions of area, direction, and distance. A Chamberlin trimetric map therefore gives an excellent overall sense of the region being mapped. Many National Geographic Society maps of single continents use this projection.

As originally implemented, the projection algorithm begins with the selection of three base points to form a spherical triangle minimally enclosing the area to be mapped. These points are mapped at the correct distance from each other according to the map’s chosen scale; aside from arbitrary rotation and translation, the position of the three points on the plane are unambiguous because a triangle is determined by the lengths of its sides. To map any point P, the spherical distances from each of the base points to P are calculated. Using each of the three mapped base points as center, a circle is drawn with radius equal to the scale spherical distance of P from the base point. The three circles will always intersect at one, two, or three points. Intersecting at one point happens only at the base points, which are already mapped and therefore need no further processing. Intersecting at two points happens only along the straight line between two mapped base points. Chamberlin did not specify how to handle this case, but it would be determined by which definition of triangle center is chosen, as noted next. In the remaining case, which is most of the map, connecting the three points of intersection of the circles by line segments creates a small triangle. The position of P′ is determined by the center of the triangle. Chamberlin did not specify which definition of center to use.

A Chamberlin trimetric projection map was originally obtained by graphically mapping points at regular intervals of latitude and longitude, with shorelines and other features then mapped by interpolation. Based on the principles of the projection, precise, but lengthy, mathematical formulas were later developed for calculating this projection by computer for a spherical Earth.

The Chamberlin trimetric projection is neither conformal nor equal-area. Rather, the projection was conceived to minimize distortion of distances everywhere with the side-effect of balancing between areal equivalence and conformality. This projection is not appropriate for mapping the entire sphere because the outer boundary would loop and overlap itself in most configurations.

In some cases, the Chamberlin trimetric projection is difficult to distinguish visually from the Lambert azimuthal equal-area projection centered on the same area.

== See also ==
- Two-point equidistant projection
