= Édouard Collignon =

French engineer and scientist

Édouard Charles Romain Collignon (1831–1913) was a French engineer and scientist, known for the Collignon projection and for his role in building railways in Russia.

== Career ==
After graduating from the l'École polytechnique in 1849, he became an ingénieur des ponts et chaussées. He became inspecteur des Ponts et chaussées in 1878.

In 1857 to 1862 he played an important role in the construction of railways from Saint Petersburg to Warsaw and from Moscow to Nizhny Novgorod.

He was a founding member of the Association française pour l’avancement des sciences. He was the author of studies on the Russian railways and of memoirs and treatises on mechanics.
