= Geography of Europe =

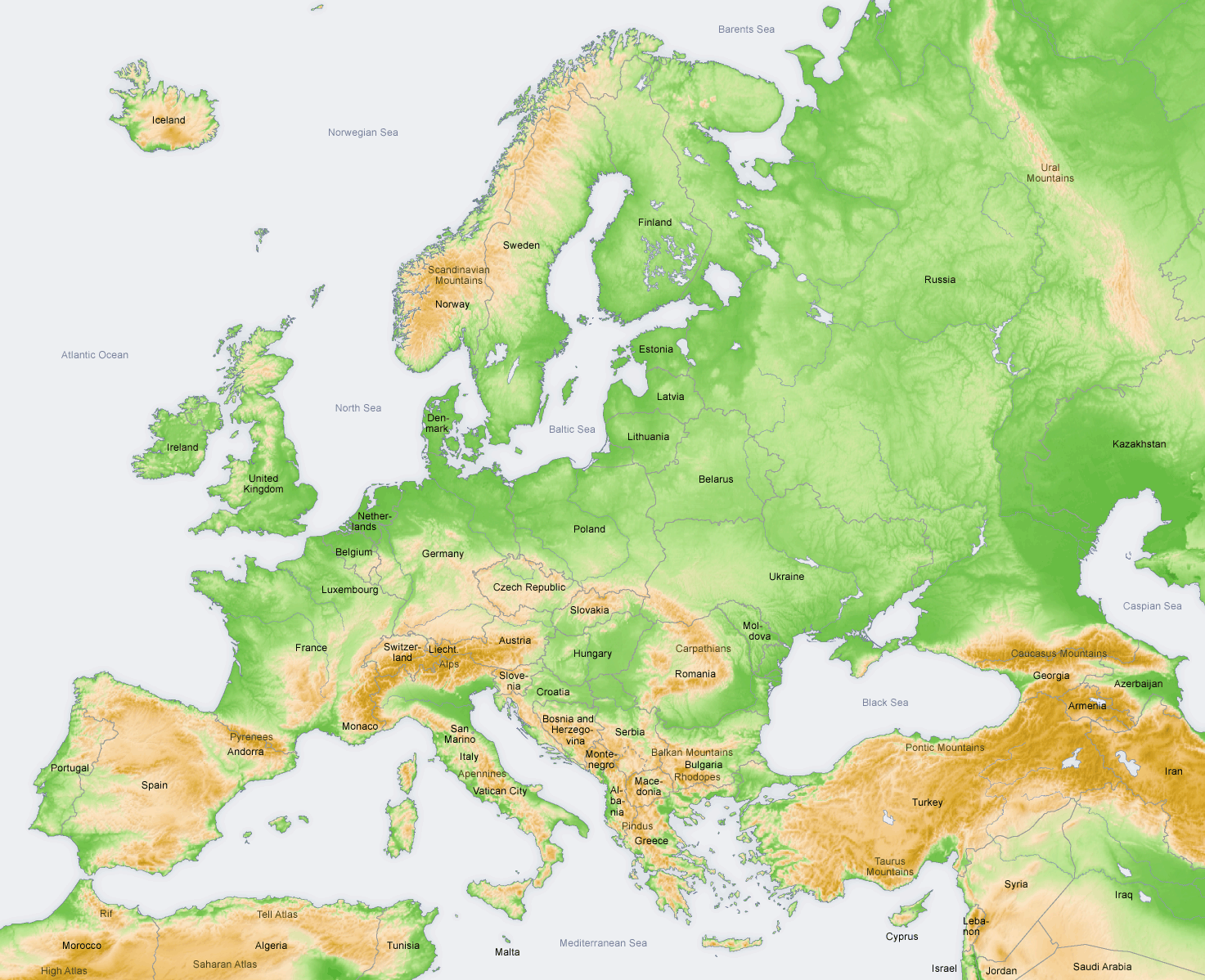
- Topography of Europe
- Area: 10,180,000 km^{2} (3,930,000 sq mi) (6th)
- Population: 742,452,000 (2013; 3rd)
- Population density: 72.9/km^{2} (188/sq mi) (2nd)
- Demonym: European
- Countries: 50 sovereign states 5 with limited recognition
- Dependencies: 4 dependencies
- Languages: ~225 languages
- Time zone: UTC−1 to UTC+5

Europe is traditionally defined as one of seven continents. Physiographically, it is the northwestern peninsula of the larger landmass known as Eurasia (or the larger Afro-Eurasia); Asia occupies the centre and east of this continuous landmass. Some geographical texts refer to a Eurasian continent given that Europe is not surrounded by sea and its southeastern border has always been variously defined for centuries.

Europe's eastern frontier is usually delineated by the Ural Mountains in Russia, which is the largest country by land area in the continent. The southeast boundary with Asia is not universally defined, but the modern definition is generally the Ural River or, less commonly, the Emba River. The boundary continues to the Caspian Sea, the crest of the Caucasus Mountains (or, less commonly, the river Kura in the Caucasus), and on to the Black Sea. The Bosporus, the Sea of Marmara, and the Dardanelles conclude the Asian boundary. The Mediterranean Sea to the south separates Europe from Africa. The western boundary is the Atlantic Ocean. Iceland is usually included in Europe because it is over twice as close to mainland Europe as mainland North America. There is ongoing debate on where the geographical centre of Europe falls.

This video was taken by the crew of Expedition 30 on board the ISS on a pass over Europe. The two videos were shot simultaneously using different cameras: one pointing toward the northeast, and one pointing toward the east.

== Overview ==
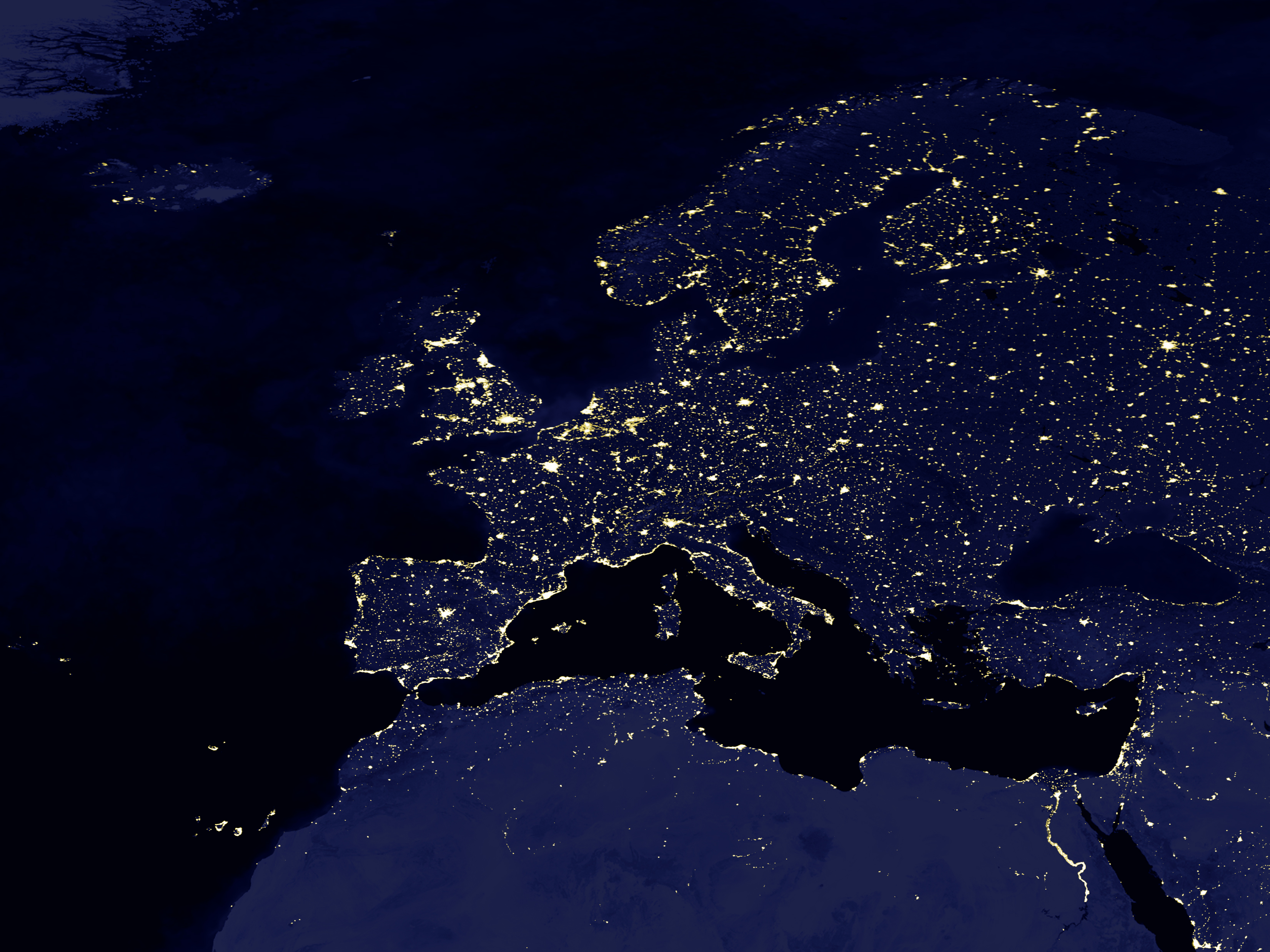
Satellite image of Europe by night

1916 physical map of Europe

In terms of shape, Europe is a collection of connected peninsulas and nearby islands. The two largest peninsulas are Europe itself and Scandinavia to the north, divided from each other by the Baltic Sea. Three smaller peninsulas—Iberia, Italy, and the Balkans—emerge from the southern margin of the mainland. The Balkan peninsula is separated from Asia by the Black and Aegean Seas. Italy is separated from the Balkans by the Adriatic Sea, and from Iberia by the Mediterranean Sea, which also separates Europe from Africa. Eastward, mainland Europe widens much like the mouth of a funnel, until the boundary with Asia is reached at the Ural Mountains and Ural River, the Caspian Sea, and the Caucasus Mountains.

Land relief in Europe shows great variation within relatively small areas. The southern regions are mountainous while moving north the terrain descends from the high Alps, Pyrenees, and Carpathians, through hilly uplands, into broad, low northern plains, which are vast in the east. An arc of uplands also exists along the northwestern seaboard, beginning in southwestern Ireland, continuing across through western and northern Great Britain, and up along the mountainous, fjord-cut spine of Norway.

This description is simplified. Sub-regions such as Iberia and Italy contain their own complex features, as does mainland Europe itself, where the relief contains many plateaus, river valleys, and basins that complicate the general trend. Iceland and the British Isles are special cases. The former is of North Atlantic volcanic formation, while the latter consist of upland areas once joined to the mainland until cut off by rising sea levels.

Partial list of European peninsulas

- Balkan Peninsula
  - Peloponnese
  - Chalkidiki
  - Istria
  - Gallipoli
- Brittany
- Cotentin Peninsula
- Crimea
- Fennoscandian Peninsula
  - Kola Peninsula
  - Scandinavian Peninsula
- Iberian Peninsula
- Italian Peninsula
- Jutland
- Kanin Peninsula

== Geology ==
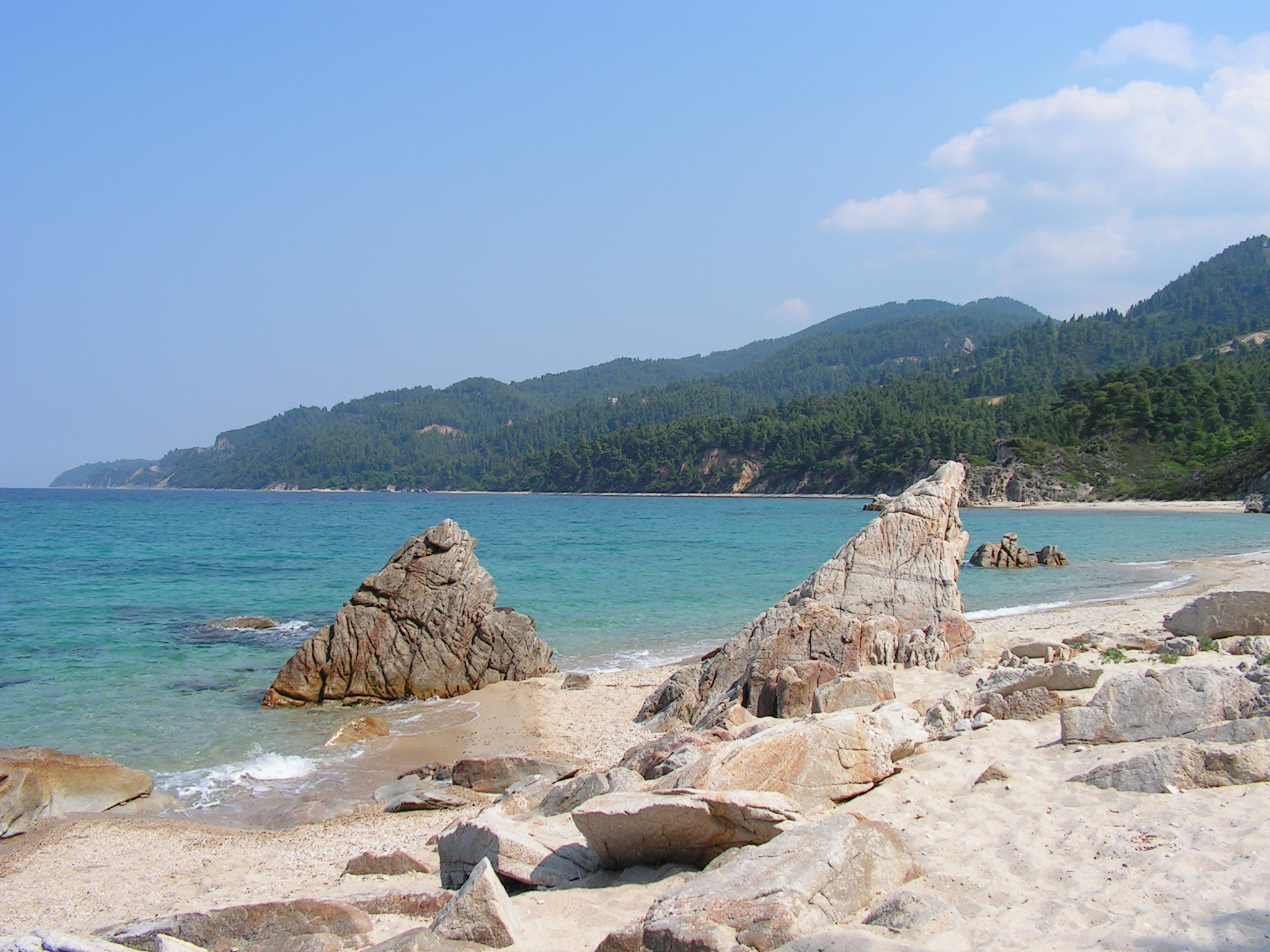
The coast of Europe is heavily indented with bays and gulfs, as here in Greece.

Europe's most significant geological feature is the dichotomy between the highlands and mountains of Southern Europe and a vast, partially underwater, northern plain ranging from Great Britain in the west to the Ural Mountains in the east. These two halves are separated by the mountain chains of the Pyrenees and the Alps/Carpathians. The northern plains are delimited in the west by the Scandinavian Mountains and the mountainous parts of the British Isles. The major shallow water bodies submerging parts of the northern plains are the Celtic Sea, the North Sea, the Baltic Sea complex, and the Barents Sea.

The northern plain contains the old geological continent of Baltica, and so may be regarded as the "main continent", while peripheral highlands and mountainous regions in the south and west constitute fragments from various other geological continents.

The geology of Europe is hugely varied and complex, and gives rise to the wide variety of landscapes found across the continent, from the Scottish Highlands to the rolling plains of Hungary.

== Population and urbanization ==
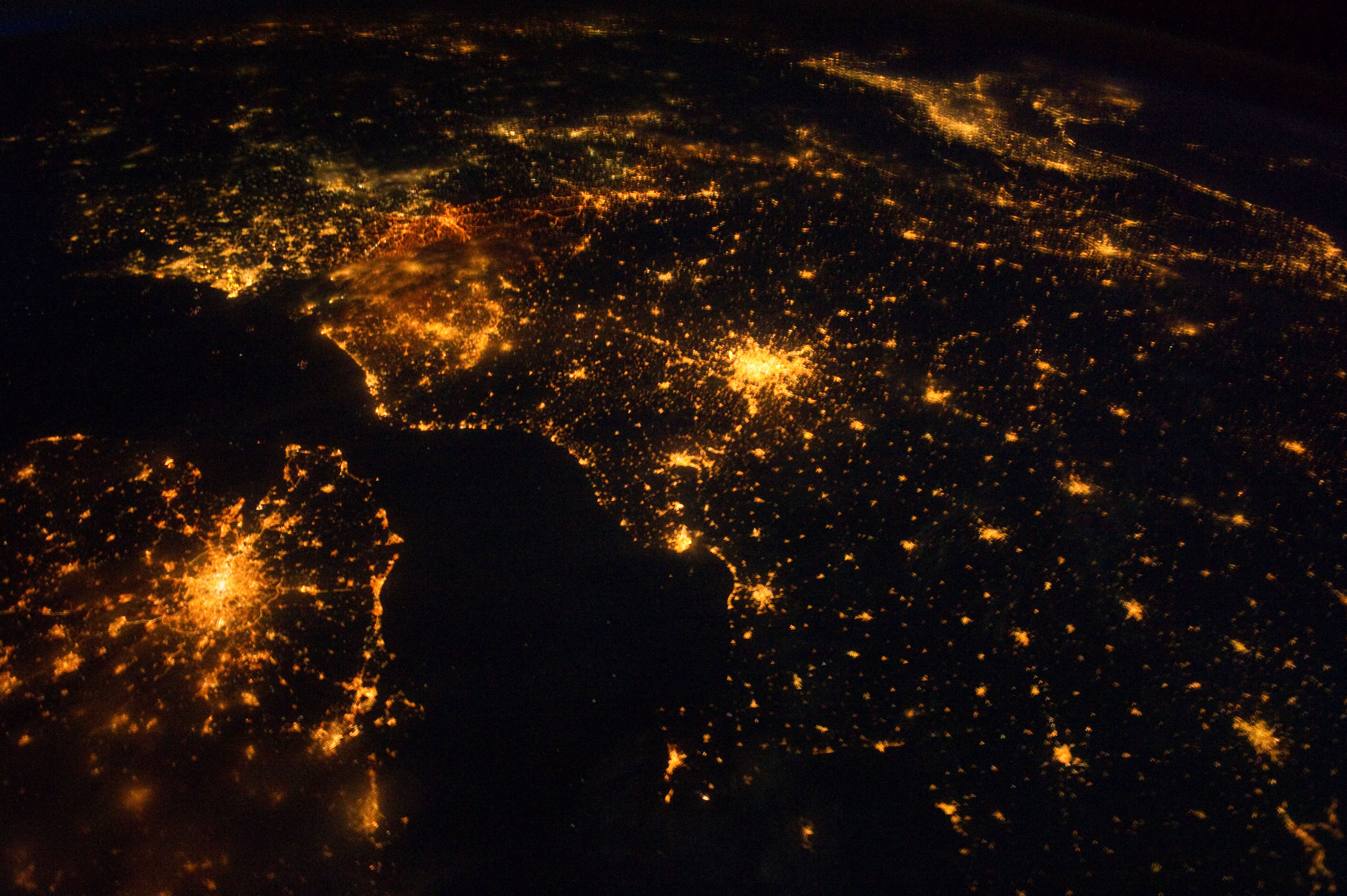
Several of the oldest cities of Northwestern Europe are highlighted in this astronaut's photograph from 00:25 GMT on 10 August 2011.

Throughout history, the population of Europe has been affected by migration into and out of the continent, disease and conflict. Figures for the population of Europe vary according to which definition of European boundaries is used. The population within the standard physical geographical boundaries was 701 million in 2005, according to the United Nations. In 2000 the population was 857 million, using a definition which includes the whole of the transcontinental countries of Russia and Turkey. Population growth is comparatively slow, and median age comparatively high in relation to the world's other continents.

The degree of urbanization is about 75%, lower than in the Americas, but significantly more than in Asia or Africa.

== Rivers ==
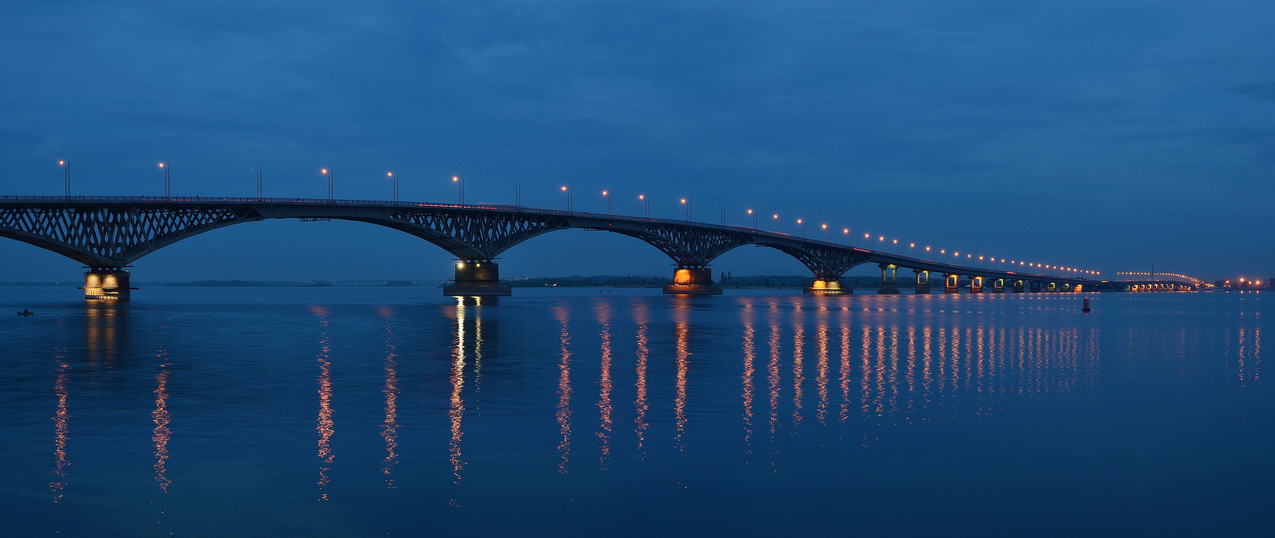
The Volga, the longest river in Europe, in Saratov Oblast, Russia

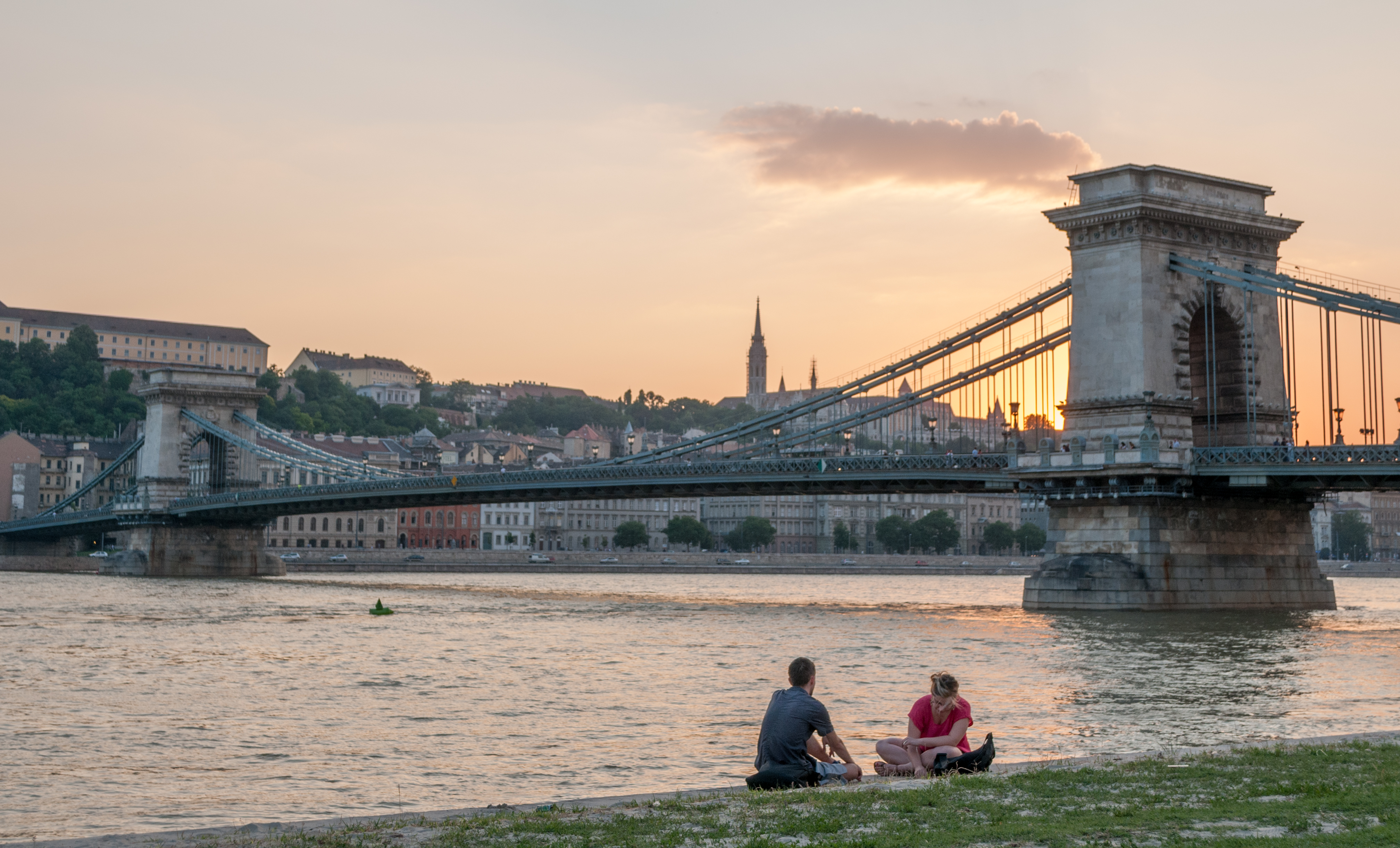
The Danube, Europe's second-longest river, in Budapest, Hungary

The most important rivers in Europe are the Danube, Volga, Rhine, Elbe, Oder and Dnieper, among others. Europe's largest waterfall (by flow rate) are the Rhine Falls.

=== European rivers by length ===
The longest rivers in Europe, directly flowing into the World Ocean or Endorheic basins, with their approximate lengths:

1. Volga – 3,690 km (2,290 mi)
2. Danube – 2,860 km (1,780 mi)
3. Ural – 2,428 km (1,509 mi)
4. Dnieper – 2,290 km (1,420 mi)
5. Don – 1,950 km (1,210 mi)
6. Pechora – 1,809 km (1,124 mi)
7. Dniester – 1,352 km (840 mi)
8. Rhine – 1,236 km (768 mi)
9. Elbe – 1,091 km (678 mi)
10. Vistula – 1,047 km (651 mi)
11. Tagus – 1,038 km (645 mi)
12. Daugava – 1,020 km (630 mi)
13. Loire – 1,012 km (629 mi)
14. Ebro – 960 km (600 mi)
15. Prut – 953 km (592 mi)
16. Neman – 937 km (582 mi)
17. Meuse – 925 km (575 mi)
18. Douro – 897 km (557 mi)
19. Kuban River – 870 km (540 mi)
20. Mezen – 857 km (533 mi)
21. Oder – 854 km (531 mi)
22. Guadiana – 829 km (515 mi)
23. Rhône – 815 km (506 mi)
24. Southern Bug – 806 km (501 mi)
25. Kuma – 802 km (498 mi)
26. Seine – 776 km (482 mi)
27. Mureș – 761 km (473 mi)
28. Northern Dvina – 744 km (462 mi)
29. Po – 682 km (424 mi)
30. Guadalquivir – 657 km (408 mi)
31. Bolshoy Uzen – 650 km (400 mi)
32. Siret – 647 km (402 mi)
33. Terek – 623 km (387 mi)
34. Glomma – 604 km (375 mi) (Norway's longest and most voluminous river)
35. Garonne – 602 km (374 mi)
36. Kemijoki – 550 km (340 mi)
37. Main – 525 km (326 mi) (longest (right) tributary of Rhine)
38. Torne – 522 km (324 mi)
39. Dalälven – 520 km (320 mi)
40. Maritsa – 515 km (320 mi)
41. Marne – 514 km (319 mi) (major tributary of the Seine)
42. Neris – 510 km (320 mi)
43. Júcar – 509 km (316 mi)
44. Dordogne – 483 km (300 mi)
45. Ume – 470 km (290 mi)
46. Ångerman – 460 km (290 mi) (Sweden's longest rivers)
47. Lule – 460 km (290 mi)
48. Gauja – 452 km (281 mi)
49. Weser – 452 km (281 mi)
50. Kalix – 450 km (280 mi)

=== European rivers by discharge ===
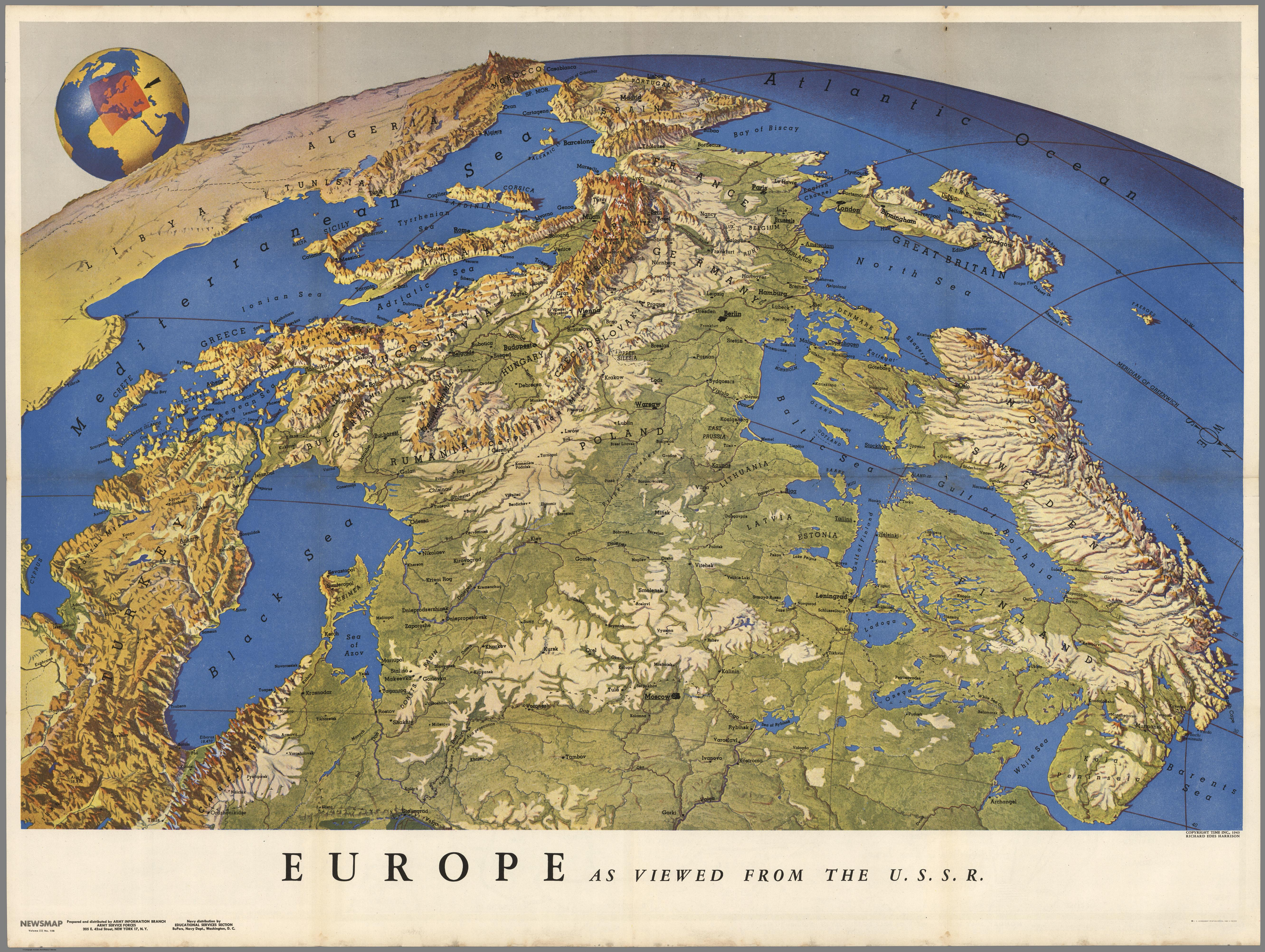
Europe as viewed from the East

The 15 rivers of Europe by average discharge, including only rivers directly flowing into the World Ocean or Endorheic basins:

1. Volga – 8,087 m^{3}/s (largest river in Eastern Europe)
2. Danube – 6,450 m^{3}/s (largest river in Central Europe)
3. Pechora – 4,380m³/s
4. Northern Dvina – 3,330m³/s
5. Neva – 2,490 m^{3}/s
6. Rhine – 2,315 m^{3}/s (largest river in Western Europe)
7. Rhône – 1,900 m^{3}/s (largest river in France)
8. Dnieper – 1,700 m^{3}/s
9. Po – 1,460 m^{3}/s (largest river in Italy)
10. Vistula – 1,080 m^{3}/s (largest river in Poland)
11. Don – 890 m^{3}/s
12. Mezen – 890 m^{3}/s
13. Loire – 889 m^{3}/s (longest river in France)
14. Elbe – 860 m^{3}/s
15. Glomma – 709 m^{3}/s (Norway's longest and most voluminous river)

== Lakes and inland seas ==
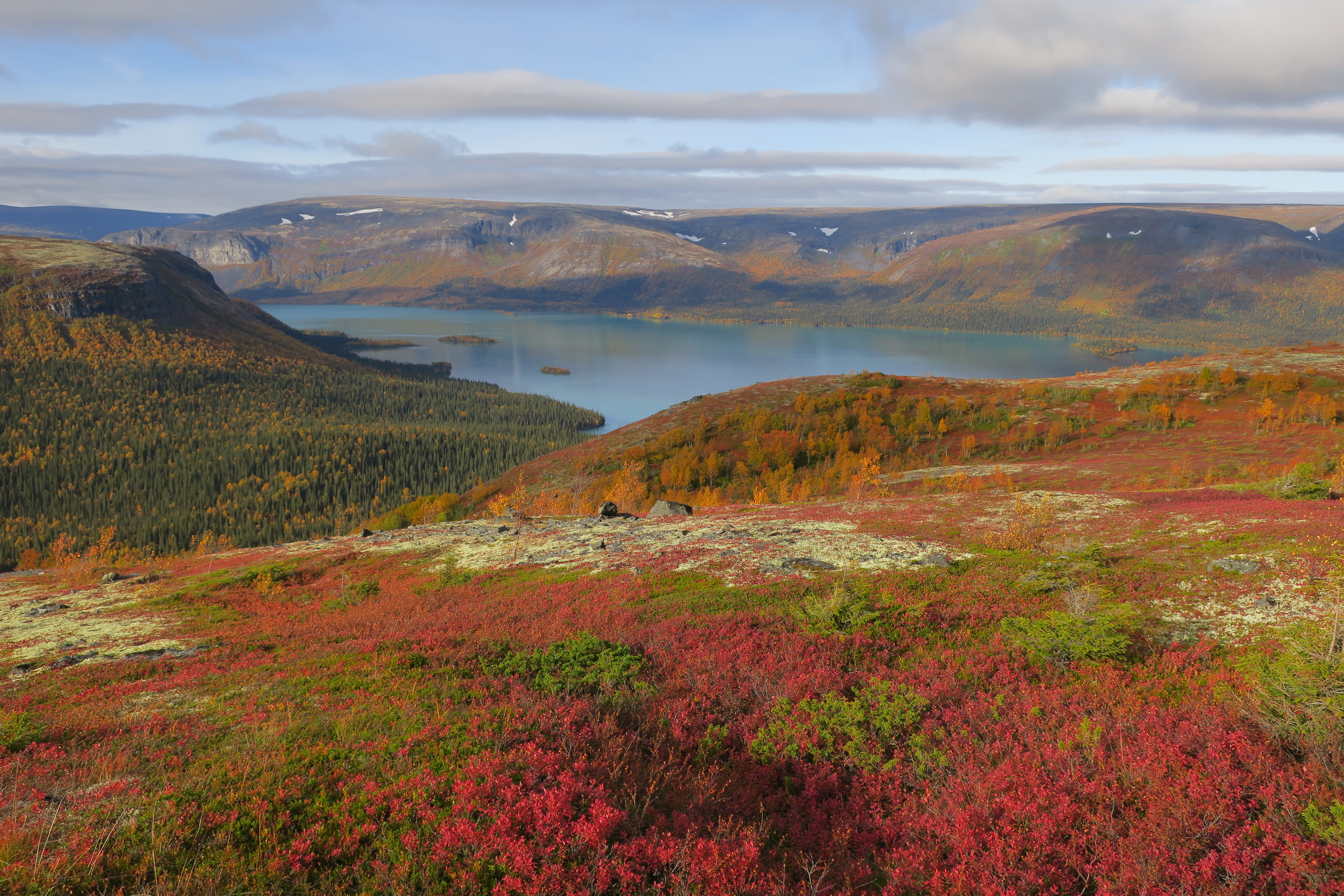
Lake Seydozero in the Kola Peninsula, one of Europe's largest peninsulas (Northern Russia)

== Major islands ==
Aegean Islands, Åland, Balearic Islands, British Isles, Corsica, Crete, Fyn, Faroe Islands, Gotland, Hinnøya, Iceland, Ionian Islands, Malta, North Jutlandic Island, Saaremaa, Sardinia, Senja, Sicily, Svalbard and Zealand.

== Plains and lowlands ==
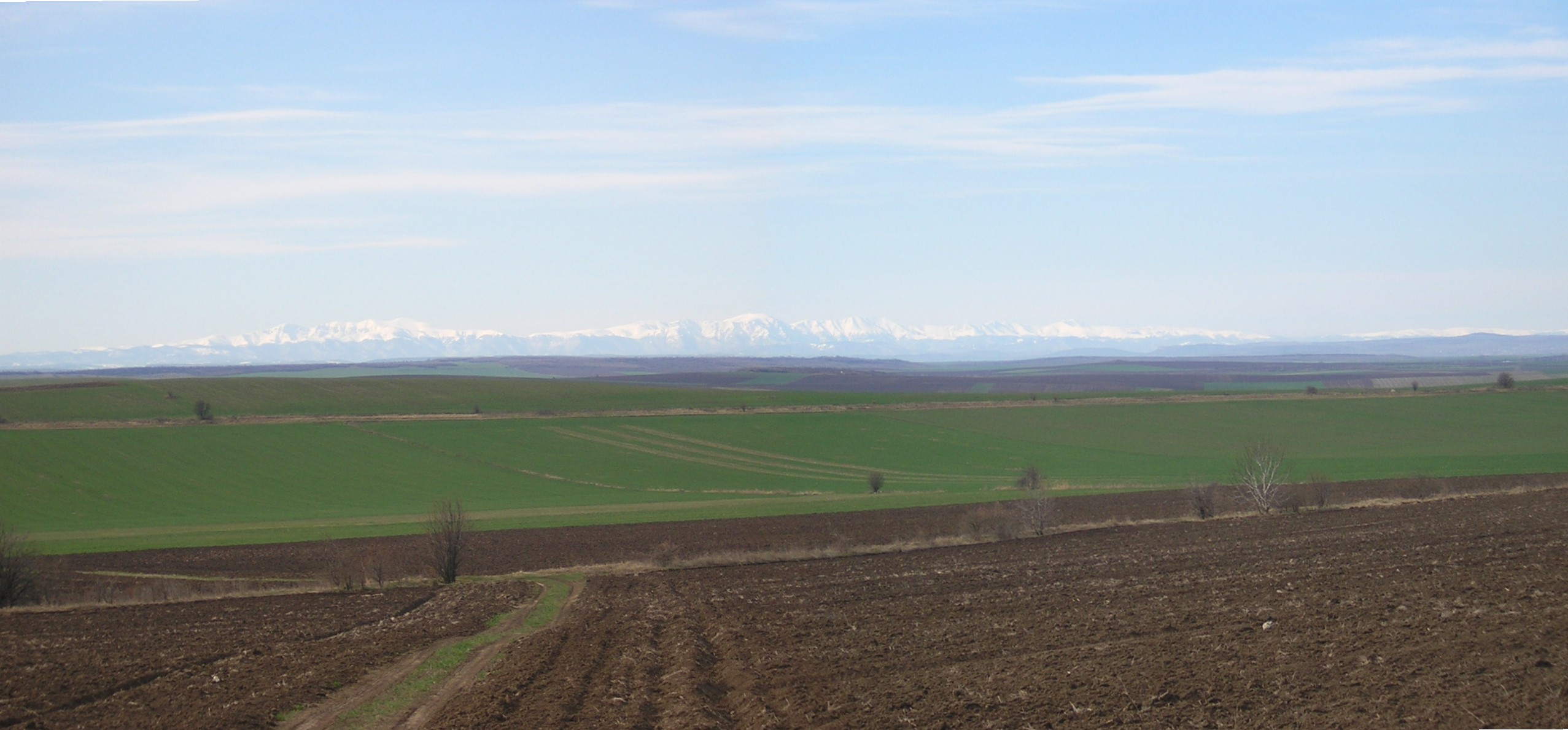
View across the Bulgarian section of the Lower Danubian Plain towards the central Balkan Mountains 90 km away

- Great European Plain, the largest landscape feature of Europe
  - East European Plain
    - Lower Danubian Plain, between Balkan Mountains and Southern Carpathians
      - Danubian Plain (Bulgaria)
      - Wallachian Plain
  - North European Plain
    - North German Plain (German section)
  - Beauce, France
- Baetic Depression (Andalusian Plain), between Sierra Morena and Baetic System
- British Lowlands
- Central Swedish lowland
- Ebro Basin (Ebro Depression), between Pyrenees and Sistema Ibérico
- Meseta Central is a high plain plateau in central Spain (occupies roughly 40% of the country), between Cantabrian Mountains, Sistema Ibérico and Sierra Morena
- Pannonian Plain, between Alps, Dinaric Mountains and Carpathian Mountains
- Po Valley, also known as Padan Plain, between Alps and Apennines
- Swiss Central Plateau, between the Jura Mountains and Swiss Alps
- Upper Rhine Plain, between Vosges Mountains and Black Forest Mountains
- Upper Thracian Plain, between Balkan Mountains (Sredna Gora) and Rila-Rhodope massif
- Other European coastal plains

== Mountain ranges ==
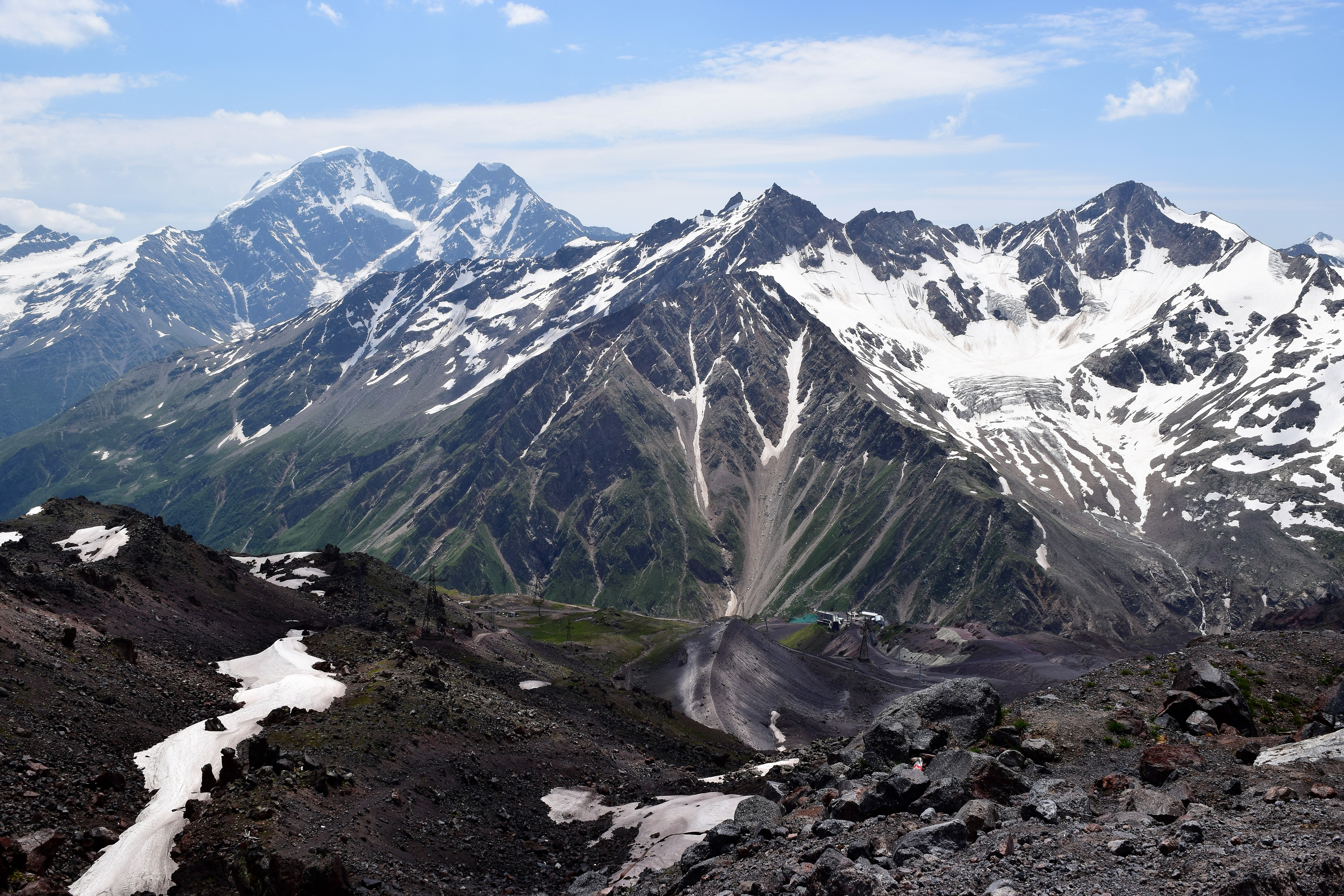
Mount Elbrus, located in Russia, is the highest mountain in Europe.

Some of Europe's major mountain ranges are:

- Alps, in Central Western Europe
  - Western Alps
  - Eastern Alps
  - Southern Alps
  - Northern Alps
- Apennines, which run through Italy
- Baetic System, Spain, Iberian Peninsula

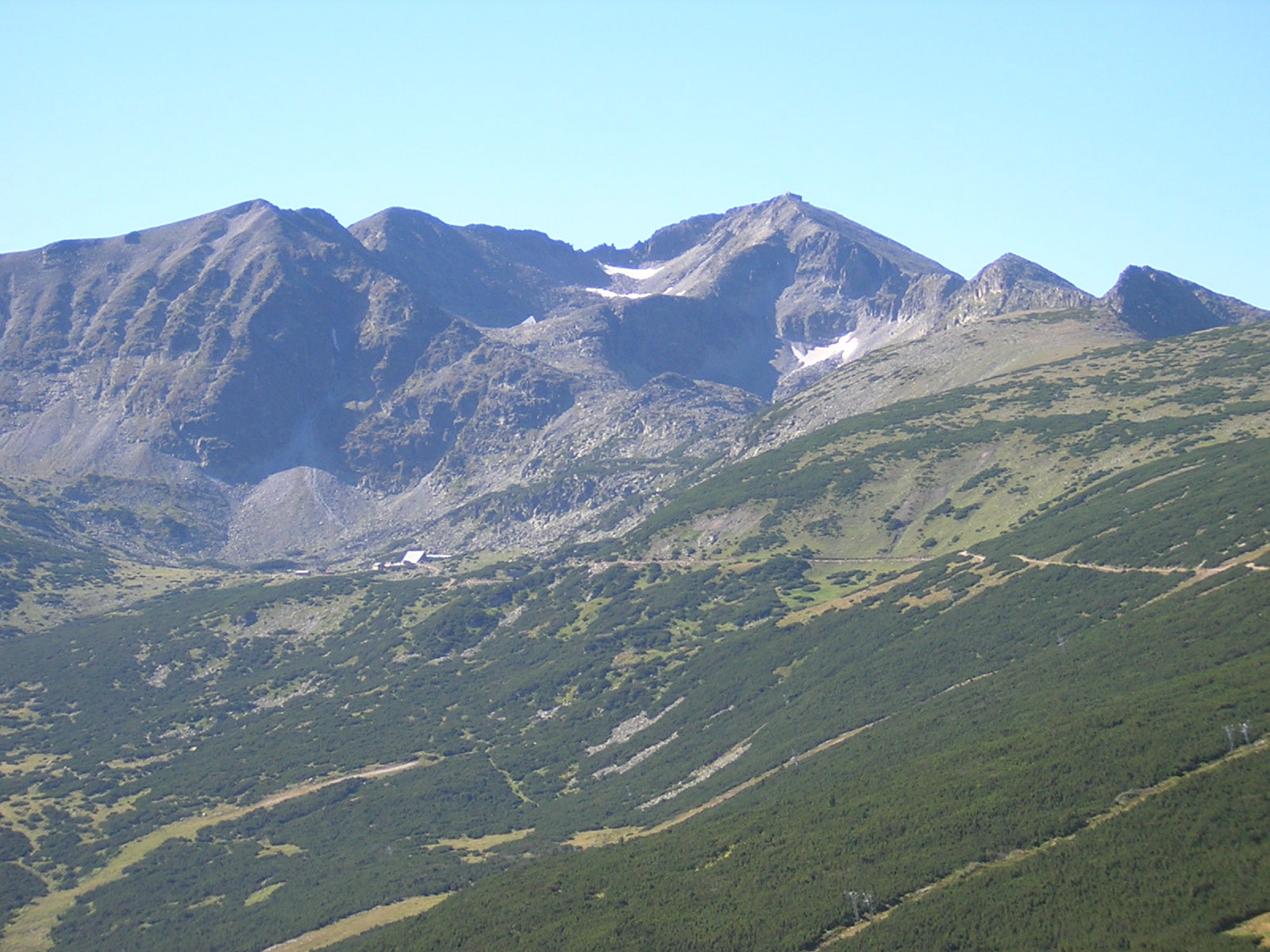
Musala, highest peak of the Balkans seen from Yastrebets. The chalet Musala and the Everest shelter can be seen as well.

- Balkan Mountains, mainly Bulgaria, central Balkan Peninsula
  - Sredna Gora Mountain range in central Bulgaria, situated south of and parallel to the Balkan Mountains
- Variscan massifs (pre-Alpine mountain ranges)
  - Black Forest
  - Bohemian Massif
  - Jura Mountains
  - Ore Mountains
  - Palatinate Forest
  - Sudetes
  - Vosges
- Cantabrian Mountains, which run across northern Spain
- Carpathian Mountains, a major mountain range in Central and Southern Europe
  - Southern Carpathians, Romania
  - Tatra Mountains, Slovakia and Poland
- Caucasus Mountains, which also separate Europe and Asia
- Crimean Mountains

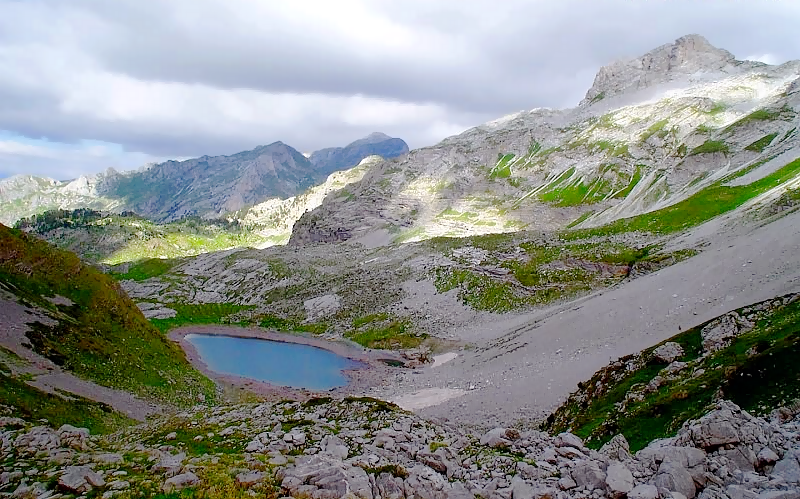
Maja Jezercë in Albania at 2,694 m high is the highest peak of the Dinaric Alps.

- Dinaric Alps, a mountain range in the Balkans
- Pindus Mountains, Albania and Greece
- Pyrenees, the natural border between France and Spain
- Rila-Rhodope mountain system composed by massifs, including Pirin Mountain and Osogovo-Belasitsa mountain chain, mainly Bulgaria
- Šar-Korab-Jakupica-Baba-Kajmakčalan-Olympus, Albania, North Macedonia and Greece
- Scandinavian Mountains, a mountain range which runs through the Scandinavian Peninsula, includes the Kjølen mountains
- Scottish Highlands (including the Cairngorms) in the United Kingdom.
- Sierra Morena, Spain
- Sistema Ibérico, Spain
- Sistema Central, Spain
- Ural Mountains, which form the boundary between Europe and Asia

Land area in different classes of European mountainous terrain

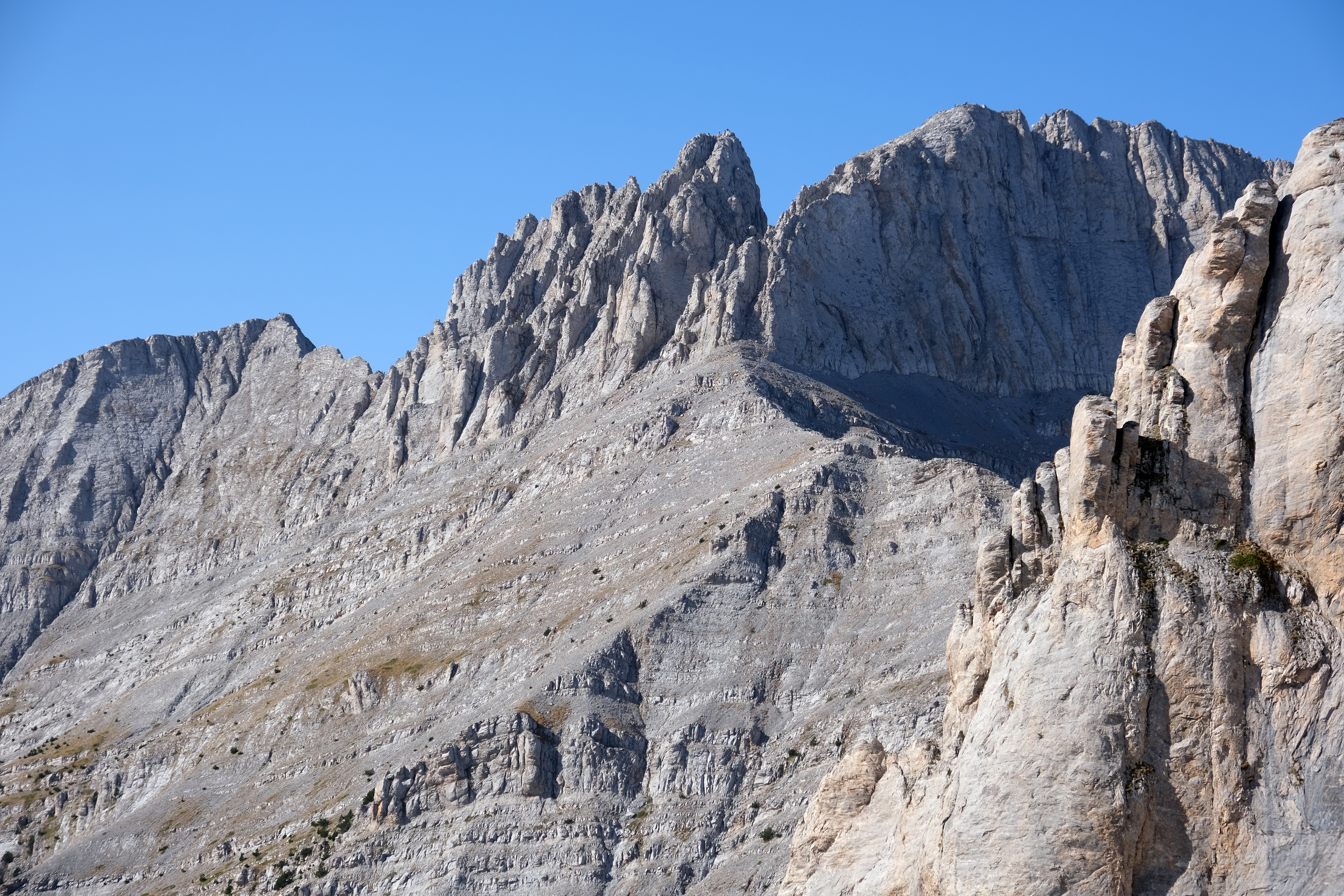
Mount Olympus, legendary abode of the Greek gods

Altitude	Area (km^{2})	% Area
≥4500 m	1	0.00%
3500–4500 m	225	0.00%
2500–3500 m	497,886	4.89%
1500–2500 m & slope ≥2°	145,838	1.43%
1000-1500m & slope ≥5° or local elevation range >300m	345,255	3.39%
300–1000 m and local elevation range >300m	1,222,104	12.00%
Mountainous total	2,211,308	21.72%
Europe total	10,180,000	100.00%

== Temperature and precipitation ==
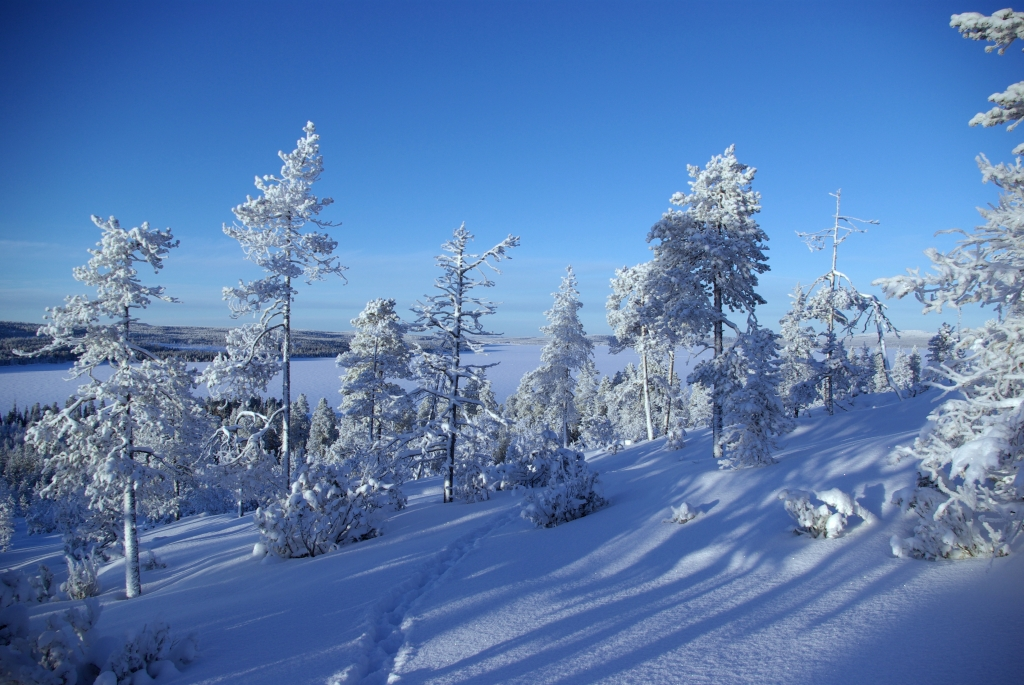
The Arctic environment of Lapland

The high mountainous areas of Europe are colder and have higher precipitation than lower areas, as is true of mountainous areas in general. Europe has less precipitation in the east than in central and western Europe. The temperature difference between summer and winter gradually increases from coastal northwest Europe to southeast inland Europe, ranging from Ireland, with a temperature difference of only 10 °C from the warmest to the coldest month, to the area north of the Caspian Sea, with a temperature difference of 40 °C. January average range from 13 °C in southern Spain and southern Greek islands to -20 °C in the northeastern part of European Russia. Desert climates are found in the European portion of Kazakhstan and South Eastern Spain.

Western Europe and parts of Central Europe generally fall into the temperate maritime climate (Cfb), the southern part is mostly a Mediterranean climate (mostly Csa, smaller area with Csb), the north-central part and east into central Russia is mostly a humid continental climate (Dfb) and the northern part of the continent is a subarctic climate (Dfc). In the extreme northern part (northernmost Russia; Svalbard), bordering the Arctic Ocean, is tundra climate (Et). Mountain ranges, such as the Alps and the Carpathian mountains, have a highland climate with large variations according to altitude and latitude.

== Climate ==
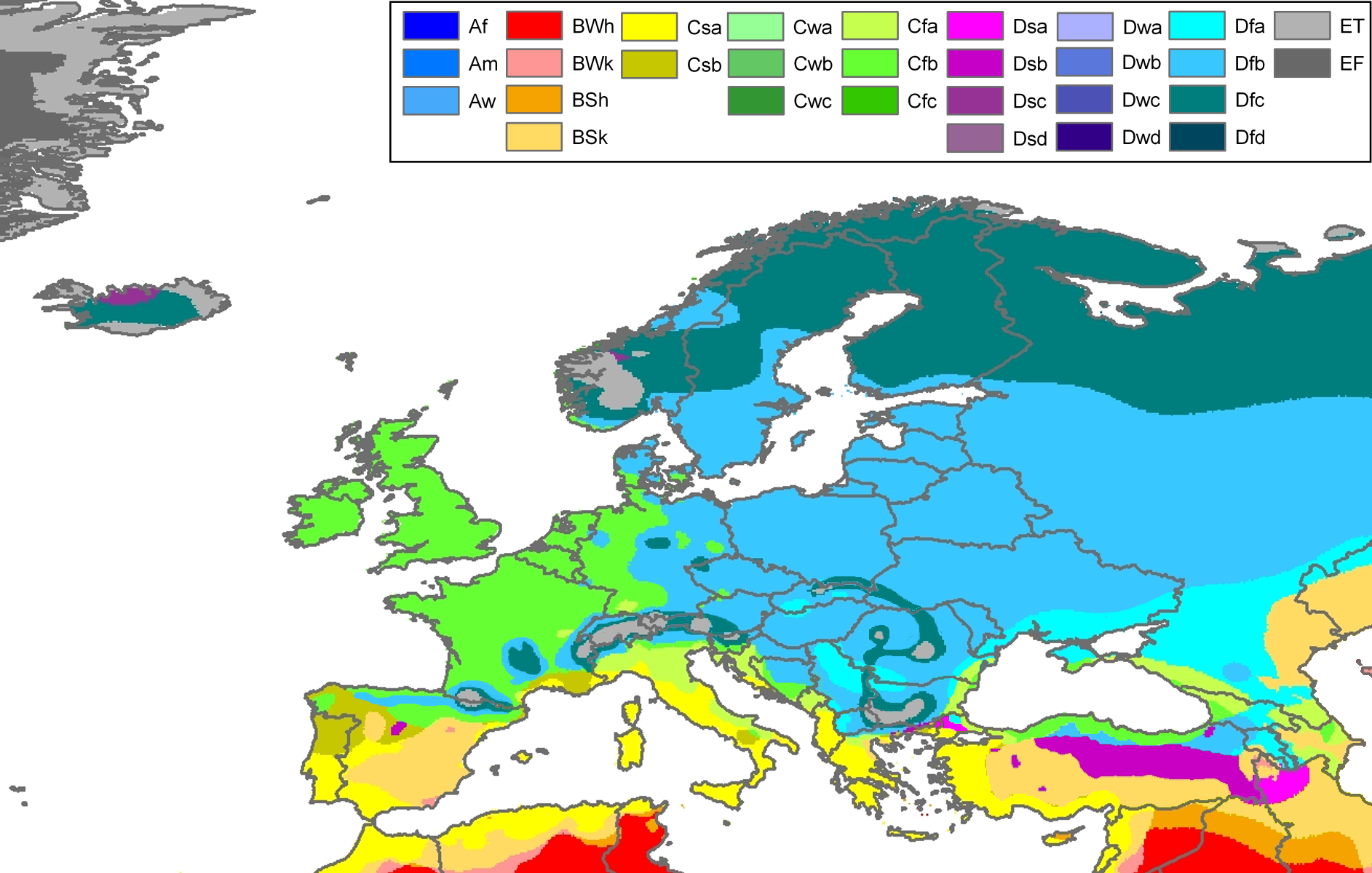
European climate. The Köppen-Geiger climates map is presented by the Climatic Research Unit of the University of East Anglia and the Global Precipitation Climatology Center of the Deutscher Wetterdienst.

Europe's climate is diverse due to its extensive range from the Arctic Ocean in the north to the Mediterranean Sea in the south, and from the Atlantic Ocean in the west to the Ural Mountains in the east. Several climatic zones intersect the continent, influenced by factors such as latitude, proximity to water bodies, elevation, and prevailing wind patterns.

The North Atlantic Drift, a warm ocean current, significantly moderates temperatures across much of Western Europe, resulting in relatively mild winters for regions at similar latitudes elsewhere. This effect is particularly evident in countries such as the United Kingdom, Ireland, and coastal Norway, which experience oceanic climates characterized by cool summers and mild, wet winters.

Southern Europe enjoys a Mediterranean climate, with hot, dry summers and mild, wet winters. This climate predominates in countries such as Spain, Italy, and Greece, where seasonal rainfall supports agriculture and tourism. Eastern Europe and parts of the continent's interior feature continental climates with more pronounced seasonal temperature differences, including cold winters and warm summers. Precipitation in these regions is relatively evenly distributed throughout the year.

Northern Europe, including Scandinavia, is characterized by subarctic and tundra climates, where winters are long and harsh, and summers are short and cool. The Arctic portions of Europe, particularly in Russia and Norway, also experience polar climates. Mountainous regions, such as the Alps and the Carpathians, exhibit alpine climates, with temperature and precipitation patterns that vary with altitude. Higher elevations generally experience cooler temperatures and greater precipitation, often in the form of snow.

Europe's climate zones have been further influenced by anthropogenic climate change, leading to rising temperatures, shifting precipitation patterns, and increased frequency of extreme weather events across the continent.

== Landlocked countries ==
The landlocked countries in Europe are: Andorra, Armenia, Austria, Belarus, Czech Republic, Hungary, Kosovo, Liechtenstein (which is doubly landlocked), Luxembourg, North Macedonia, Moldova, San Marino, Serbia, Slovakia, Switzerland, Vatican City

Switzerland, Liechtenstein, Austria, Czech Republic, Slovakia, Hungary, Serbia, and North Macedonia constitute a contiguous landlocked agglomeration of eight countries in Central Europe and the Balkans, stretching from Geneva all the way to Skopje. The other landlocked countries are "standalone" landlocked, not bordering any other such European one (the emphasis is necessary, since Kazakhstan borders Turkmenistan, Uzbekistan, and Kyrgyzstan, thus forming a vast landlocked expanse in Central Asia).

== Countries consisting solely of islands or parts of islands ==
- Cyprus
- Iceland
- Ireland
- Malta
- United Kingdom

== Countries bordering or spanning another continent ==
Eurasia	Armenia, Azerbaijan, Republic of Cyprus, Georgia, Kazakhstan, Russia, Turkey, Greece (some Aegean islands and Kastelorizo island in southeastern Mediterranean)
Europe-Africa	Malta, Spain (Ceuta, Melilla and Canary Islands), Italy (Lampedusa and Lampione), Portugal (Madeira), France (Réunion and Mayotte)
Europe-South America	France (French Guiana)
Europe-North America	France (Guadeloupe, Martinique, and St. Pierre et Miquelon), Iceland, Denmark (Greenland), the Netherlands (Bonaire, Saba, and St. Eustatius), Portugal (Corvo Island, Flores Island)

== Countries whose capital is not the most populous ==
Country	Capital	Largest city or municipality
Liechtenstein	Vaduz	Schaan
Malta	Valletta	Birkirkara
San Marino	San Marino	Serravalle
Switzerland	Bern	Zürich
Turkey	Ankara	Istanbul

Note: Italy's capital, Rome, is the country's largest city if only the municipality (comune) is considered. Greater Milan is the largest metropolitan area in Italy.

Brussels is considered to be the largest city of Belgium, according to the population of the Brussels-Capital Region. The population of the City of Brussels is ~175,000. Antwerp is the biggest city of the country.

== List of countries by the number of other countries they border ==
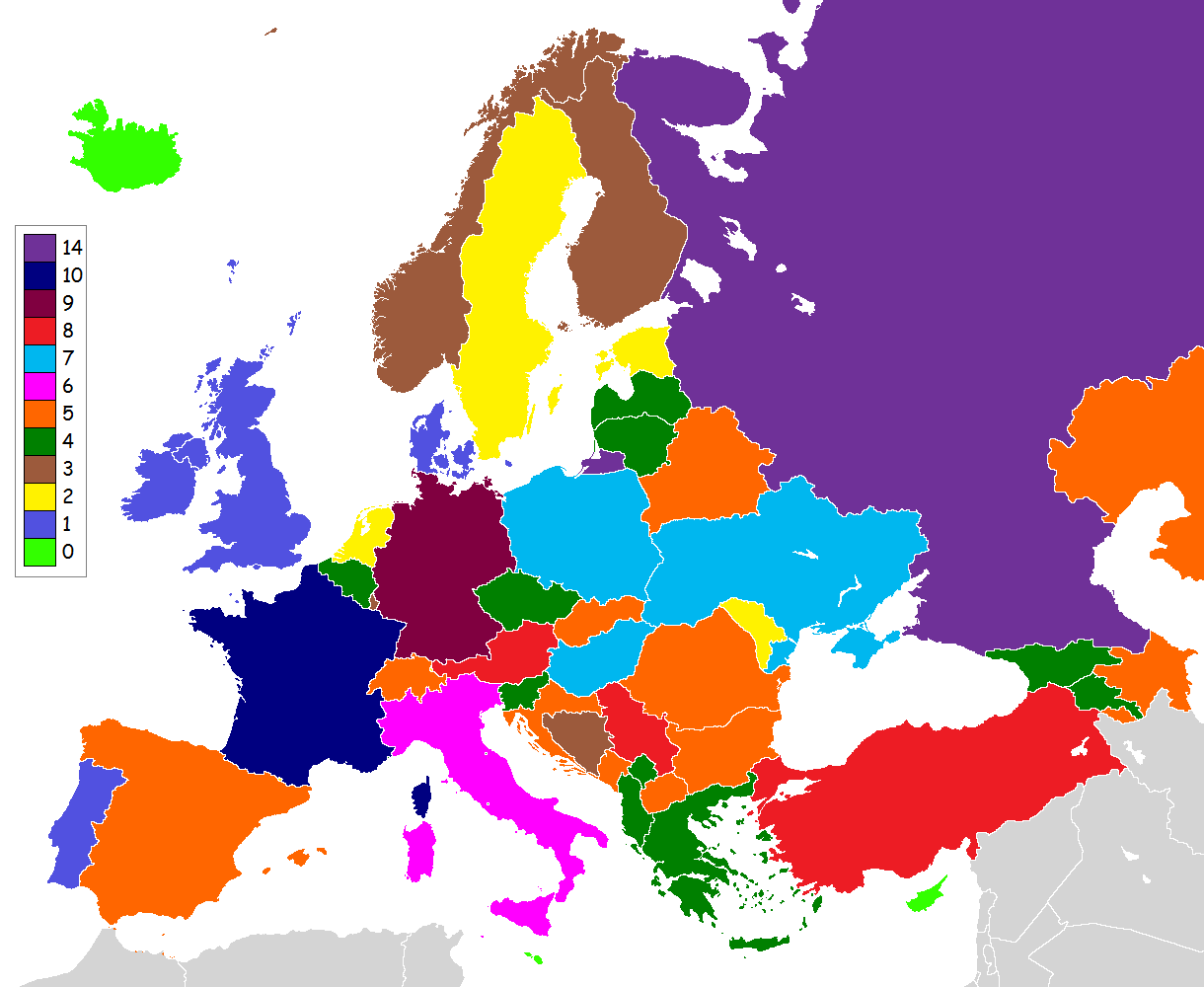
Map of European countries by number of neighbouring countries

14	Russia (Including Kaliningrad)
11	France (Including overseas departments and territories)
9	Germany
8	Austria, Serbia, Turkey, France (Excluding overseas departments)
7	Hungary, Poland, Ukraine
6	Italy
5	Azerbaijan, Belarus, Bulgaria, Croatia, Kazakhstan, Romania, North Macedonia, Slovakia, Spain (Including Ceuta and Melilla), Switzerland
4	Albania, Armenia, Belgium, the Czech Republic, Georgia, Greece, Kosovo, Latvia, Lithuania, Montenegro, Slovenia
3	Bosnia and Herzegovina, Finland, the Netherlands (Including Sint Maarten), Norway, Luxembourg
2	Andorra, Estonia, Liechtenstein, Moldova, Sweden
1	Denmark, Ireland, Monaco, Portugal, San Marino, the United Kingdom, Vatican City
0	Iceland, Cyprus, Malta

== See also ==
- Regions of Europe
- European grid
- European Union
- Western Europe
- Central Europe
- Eastern Europe
- Northern Europe
- Southern Europe
- Southeast Europe
- Extreme points of Europe
- Intermediate Region
- Extreme points of the European Union
- List of European ultra-prominent peaks
- List of the highest European ultra-prominent peaks
- List of mountain ranges
- Southernmost glacial mass in Europe
- Countries bordering the European Union
- Extreme points of Eurasia
- Extreme points of Afro-Eurasia
- Geography of the European Union
- Special member state territories and the European Union
- Age of Discovery
- Explorers of Russia
