= LAEA =

- LAEA is an acronym for Lambert azimuthal equal-area projection (LAEA)
- LaeA (loss of aflR-expression A) is the name of a protein and its associated gene that is part of the Velvet complex, which regulates reproduction and production of secondary metabolites including penicillin in fungi
