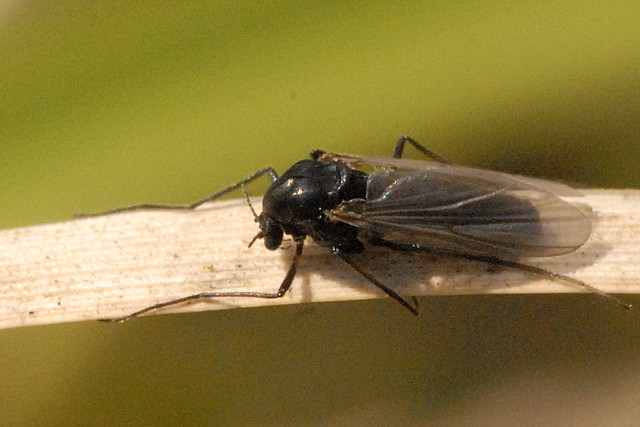

Scientific classification
- Kingdom: Animalia
- Phylum: Arthropoda
- Clade: Pancrustacea
- Class: Insecta
- Order: Diptera
- Family: Chironomidae
- Genus: Acricotopus
- Species: A. lucens

Binomial name
- Acricotopus lucens (Zetterstedt, 1850)

= Acricotopus lucens =

Species of insect

Acricotopus lucens (also known as chironomus lucens) is a species of insect in the diptera order and belongs to the genus Acricotopus in the family Chironomidae (known better as non-biting midges or lake flies). It is a fly native to Europe and can mostly be found in Northwestern Europe, such as the Benelux area or the United Kingdom, but they've also been found in other areas of Northern Europe. They are facultatively mobile animals.

== Distribution and habitat ==
=== Distribution ===
Most Acricotopus lucens have been recorded around Northwestern Europe. Many records can be found around the Benelux area, the United Kingdom and Ireland. However, some specimens have been found in other areas of Northern Europe, such as the Scandinavian Peninsula, consisting of Norway, Sweden and Finland. They tend to live near the countries' edges.

=== Habitat ===
A. lucens tend to live near pond edges and lakes, and as most insects in the Chironomidae family, they tend to live in aquatic and aerian habitats. They have also been recorded to live near seas and oceans, such as those of Ireland or the Benelux area. Specimens have also been recorded to live near the seas of the Scandinavian Peninsula, especially the Baltic Sea.
