= European Plain =

Largest mountain-free landform in Europe

Coordinates: 57.5000°N 29.0000°E

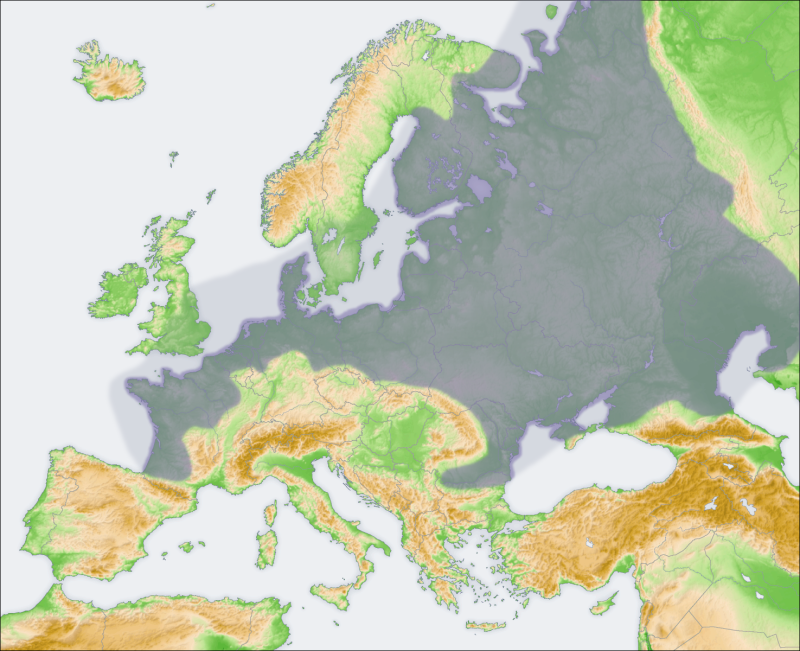
The European Plain marked in grey

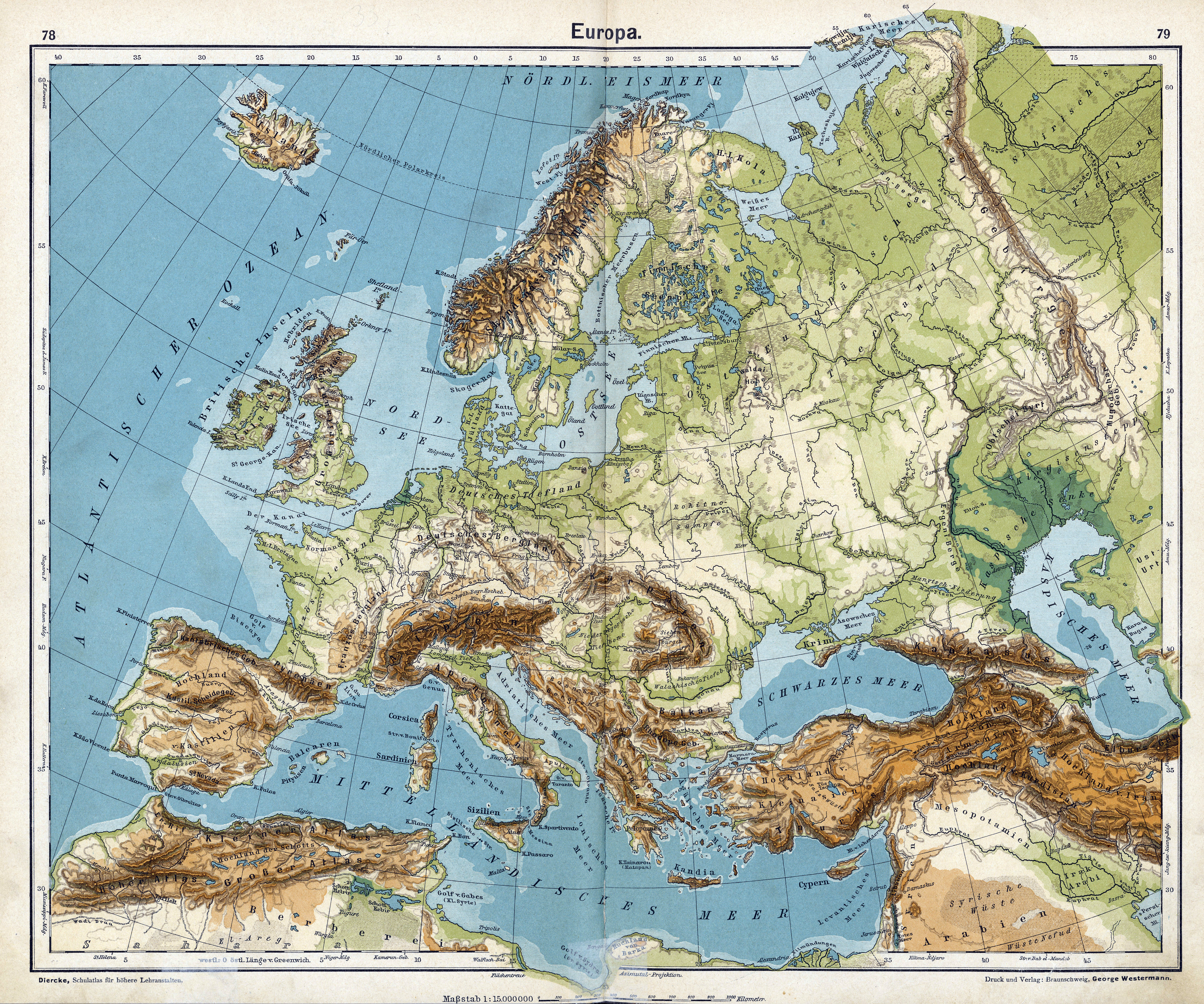
Topography of Europe

Biomes of the Western Palearctic realm

The European Plain, also referred to as the Great European Plain, is a large plain in Europe and a major feature of one of four major topographical units of Europe – the Central and Interior Lowlands. It is the largest mountain-free landform in Europe, although a number of highlands are identified within it.

== Location ==
The Great European Plain stretches from the Pyrenees Mountains and the French coast of the Bay of Biscay in the west to the Russian Ural Mountains in the east, including parts of Belgium, the Netherlands, Germany, Denmark, Poland, Lithuania, Latvia, Estonia, Finland, Belarus, Ukraine, Moldova, Romania, Bulgaria, and Kazakhstan. Most of the Great European Plain lies below 500 feet (152 metres) in elevation. It has coastlines in the west and northwest to marginal seas of the Atlantic Ocean, in the northeast to seas of the Arctic Ocean, and in the southeast to the Black Sea. To the south of the Middle European Plain stretch the central uplands and plateaus of Europe elevating to the peaks of the Alps, the Carpathian Mountains and the Balkan Mountains. To the northwest across the English Channel lie the British Isles and their lowlands, while across several straits north of the Jutland Peninsula lies the Central Swedish lowland in the Scandinavian Peninsula, which is part of the Fennoscandia ecoregion.

Most of the plain lies in the temperate broadleaf and mixed forest biome, while its far eastern portion extends into steppe of the ecoregion Eurasian Steppe.

Beside the Great European Plain, there are other, smaller European plains such as the Pannonian Basin or Mid-Danube Plain, which lies in Central Europe, Padana Plain which is located in the valley of the Po river, the Thracian Plain with the Maritsa River, and lowlands of the British Isles.

The Great European Plain is divided into the North European Plain (Central/Middle European Plain) and the East European Plain. The subdivision is a historical one, rather than geomorphological: the Russian portion of the East European Plain is also known as the Russian Plain which covers almost all of European Russia.

In Western Europe, the plain is relatively narrow (mostly within 200 miles or 320 kilometres in width) in the northern part of Europe, but it broadens significantly toward its eastern part in Western Russia.

== Hydrology ==
The plains are cut by many important rivers like the Loire, Rhine, and Vistula in the west; the Northern Dvina and Daugava flowing northwards in Eastern Europe and Russia and the Volga, the Don, and the Dnieper flowing southwards of European Russia.

=== List of large bodies of water ===
- Baltic Sea
- Bay of Biscay
- Black Sea
- Caspian Sea
- English Channel
- Gulf of Bothnia
- North Sea
- Sea of Azov
- White Sea

== Ecology ==
The European Plain was once largely covered by forest, before human settlement and the resulting deforestation that occurred. One of the last (and largest) remnants of this primeval forest is Białowieża Forest, which straddles the border between Belarus and Poland. Now the European Plain is the most agriculturally productive region of Europe. Ecological regions include:

- Atlantic mixed forests
- Baltic mixed forests
- East European forest steppe
- Pontic–Caspian steppe

== Geopolitical significance ==
The large uninterrupted flatland of the European Plain provides very little geographic protection against invasion. This has been a continuing problem for states whose heartlands are on the European Plain, especially Russia, Poland, and France, the latter of which was invaded through the plain three times since 1870, two of which successfully occupied the country (1870 and 1940). Historically, the plains have been the site of numerous battles and invasions, as they offer relatively easy access to neighboring countries and provide an open space for armies to maneuver. They also play a major role in the European Union as a key region for trade and industry. The EU's Common Agricultural Policy, which regulates agricultural production, is also heavily influenced by the plains. The plains are also a major center for the production of renewable energy. Additionally, the plains are also home to many of Europe's most important cultural and historical sites.

== See also ==
- Geography of Europe
