= Schmidt net =

Schmidt net, used for making plots of the Lambert azimuthal projection.

The Schmidt net is a manual drafting method for the Lambert azimuthal equal-area projection using graph paper. It results in one lateral hemisphere of the Earth with the grid of parallels and meridians. The method is common in geoscience.

== Construction ==
In the figure, the area-preserving property of the projection can be seen by comparing a grid sector near the center of the net with one at the far right of the net. The two sectors have the same area on the sphere and the same area on the disk. The angle-distorting property can be seen by examining the grid lines; most of them do not intersect at right angles on the Schmidt net. A single Schmidt net can only represent one hemisphere of the earth; typically a pair of Schmidt nets is used to represent both sides of the globe.

It is relatively simple to re-plot a gridded map of the world onto a Schmidt net if the azimuth is chosen to be the junction of the equator with any particular meridian from the world-map's grid. Each grid square surrounding this chosen longitude is simply re-plotted into the corresponding distorted grid-square in the Schmidt net. Points of latitude-longitude can be plotted relative to the azimuth's longitude, interpolating between grid lines in the Schmidt net. For greater accuracy, it is helpful to have a net with finer spacing than 10°; spacings of 2° are common.

Animation demonstrating the alternative use of a Schmidt net to produce a Lambert equal-area projection using a polar azimuth.

The Schmidt net is not an appropriate grid for representing the Earth's northern or southern hemisphere (because the lines would not correspond to meridians or parallels in such a projection). However, it can be used as a scalar measuring device for projecting latitude-longitude points onto a blank circle of the same size, to produce a Lambert equal-area projection with the azimuth at the north or south pole. The intersection of the parallels with the outer circle can be used as a de facto protractor for plotting a point's longitude as the angle in the polar projection. The Schmidt net's horizontal axis can then be used as a scalar measuring device to convert the point's latitude (relative to the pole) into a radial distance from the centre of the circle. Alternatively, the Schmidt net could be replaced entirely with a correctly projected polar grid, and grid squares from a map re-drawn into this disc.

== Use ==
Researchers in structural geology use the Lambert azimuthal projection to plot lineation and foliation in rocks, slickensides in faults, and other linear and planar features. In this context the projection is called the equal-area hemispherical projection. The Schmidt net is often used to sketch out the Lambert azimuthal projection for these purposes. Conversely, the Wulff net ("equal-angle projection") is used to plot crystallographic axes and faces.

== Sources ==
- Borradaile, Graham J. (2003). Statistics of Earth science data. Berlin: Springer-Verlag. ISBN 3-540-43603-0.
- Hobbs, Bruce E., Means, Winthrop D., and Williams, Paul F. (1976). An outline of structural geology. New York: John Wiley & Sons, Inc. ISBN 0-471-40156-0.
- Ramsay, John G. (1967). Folding and fracturing of rocks. New York: McGraw-Hill.
