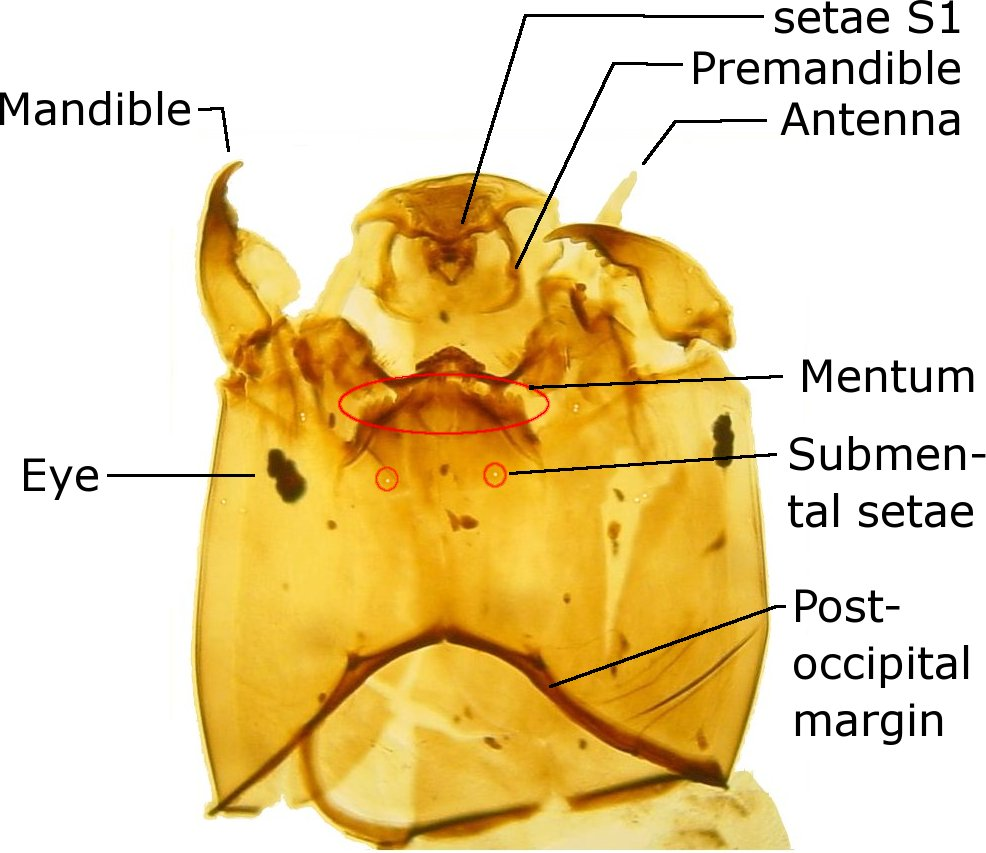
- Head of an Acricotopus longipalpus larva

Scientific classification
- Kingdom: Animalia
- Phylum: Arthropoda
- Class: Insecta
- Order: Diptera
- Family: Chironomidae
- Genus: Acricotopus; Kieffer, 1921

= Acricotopus =

Genus of flies

Acricotopus is a genus of non-biting midges of the bloodworm family Chironomidae.

== Species ==
- A. lucens (Zetterstedt, 1850)
- A. simplex Zhang & Wang 2004
- A. zhalingensis Zhang
