= North European Plain =

Geomorphological region in Europe

Coordinates: 54°00′N 14°00′E

North European Plain coloured in green.

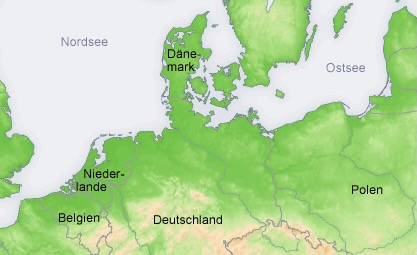
Topography of the North European Plain.

The North European Plain (German: Norddeutsches Tiefland – North German Plain; Mitteleuropäische Tiefebene; Polish: Nizina Środkowoeuropejska – Central European Plain; Danish: Nordeuropæiske Lavland and Dutch: Noord-Europese Laagvlakte; French: Plaine d'Europe du Nord) is a geomorphological region in Europe that covers all or parts of Belgium, the Netherlands (i.e. the Low Countries), Germany, Denmark, and Poland.

It consists of the low plains between the Hercynian Europe (Central European Highlands) to the south and coastlines of the North Sea and the Baltic Sea to the north. These two seas are separated by the Jutland Peninsula (Denmark). The North European Plain is connected to the East European Plain, together forming the majority of the Great European Plain (European Plain).

== Geography ==
Elevations vary between 0 and 200 m (0 to about 650 ft). While mostly used as farmland, the region also contains bogs, heath and lakes. The Wadden Sea, a large tidal area, is located on the North Sea coast.

A number of freshwater lagoons including the Szczecin Lagoon, the Vistula Lagoon and the Curonian Lagoon are found on the Baltic Sea coast.

== Location ==
The North European Plain covers Flanders (northern Belgium and Northern France), the Netherlands, Northern Germany, Denmark, and most of central-western Poland; it touches the Czech Republic and southwestern part of Sweden as well.

Parts of eastern England can also be considered part of the same plain; as they share its low-lying character and were connected by land to the continent during the last ice age. The Northern European Plains are located also under the Baltic Sea.

== Rivers ==
Major river-drainage basins include, from west to east: the Ems, Weser, Elbe, Oder, Vistula, and this region of Europe is where the Rhine River starts.

The soils surrounding the river basins are thin, making agriculture difficult.

== Sub-regions ==
=== Low Countries ===
Historically, especially in the Middle Ages and Early modern period, the western section has been known as the Low Countries.

=== North German Plain ===
The North German Plain is located north of the Central Uplands of Germany.

=== Polish Plain ===
The part in modern-day Poland is called the "Polish Plain" (Polish: Niż Polski or Nizina Polska) and stretches from the Baltic Sea in the north to the Sudetes and Carpathians

=== English flatlands ===
The extension of the plain into England consists mainly of the flatlands of East Anglia, the Fens, and Lincolnshire, where the landscape is in parts strikingly similar to that of the Netherlands.

== See also ==
- Geography of Germany
- Geography of Poland
