= European grid =

Proposed mapping standard

A map of Europe in ETRS89-LAEA projection

The European grid is a proposed, multipurpose Pan-European mapping standard. It is based on the ETRS89 coordinate reference system and the Lambert Azimuthal Equal-Area projection, with the centre of the projection at the point 52° N, 10° E and false easting: x0 = 4321000 m, false northing: y0 = 3210000 m (CRS identifier in Inspire: ETRS89-LAEA).

The grid is designated as Grid_ETRS89-LAEA5210. For identification of an individual resolution level, the name is extended by identification of cell size in metres (example: _100K).

The origin of Grid_ETRS89-LAEA5210 coincides with the false origin of the ETRS89-LAEA coordinate reference system (x=0, y=0). Grid points of grids based on ETRS89-LAEA must coincide with grid points at Grid_ETRS89-LAEA5210.

The grid is defined as hierarchical in metric coordinates in powers of 10. The resolution of the grid is 1m, 10m, 100m, 1000m, 10,000m, 100,000m. The grid orientation is south-north, west-east. The reference point of the grid cell for grids based on ETRS89-LAEA is the lower left corner of the grid cell.

== Norms ==
- Official requirements, directives 2007/2/EC of the European Parliament: https://eur-lex.europa.eu/LexUriServ/LexUriServ.do?uri=OJ:L:2010:323:0011:0102:EN:PDF
- Current implementation of requirements, as INSPIRE standard: https://inspire.ec.europa.eu/documents/Data_Specifications/INSPIRE_DataSpecification_GG_v3.1.pdf

== See also ==
- ETRS89
- Lambert Azimuthal Equal-Area projection
