= Velvet complex =

Fungus protein

Velvet complex is a group of proteins found in fungi and especially molds that are important in reproduction and production of secondary metabolites including penicillin. The core members of the complex include VeA, LaeA (loss of aflR-expression A), and VelB. Other proteins including VelC and VosA sometimes function in the complex. The proteins were first characterized in Aspergillus nidulans.

Some proteins in the complex are light-sensitive, including the founding member, VeA (Velvet A), which was first described in 1965.

Four of these proteins, VeA, VelB, VelC, and VosA, have an approximately 200 amino acid domain called the velvet domain.

Some fungal infections that are present in humans and sometimes plants have been traced down to certain velvet complex elements.

The Velvet complex seems to affect a number of functions that are of pathogenic nature. This process is facilitated, managed and administered by the proteins of velvet complex.

Velvet complex proteins have also been encountered in the genome sequence of fungal organisms in the form of transcription factors.

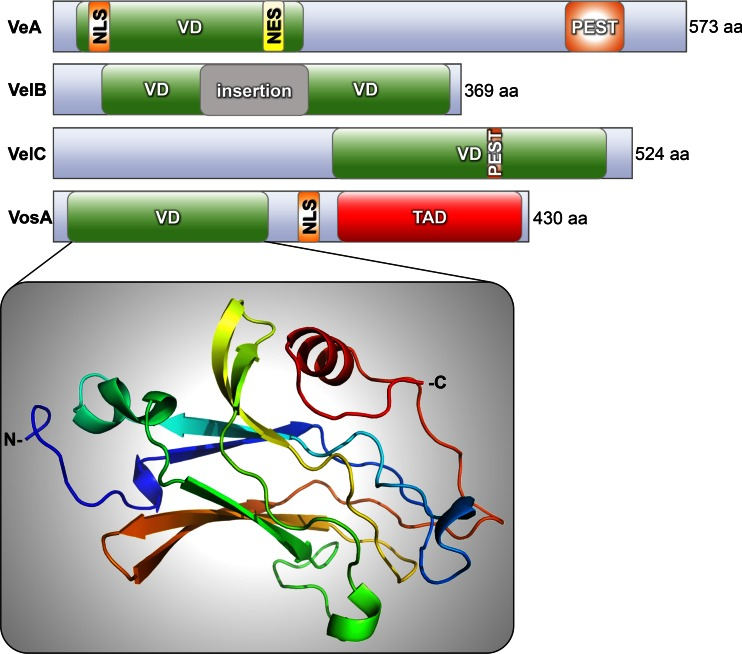
Authors caption: Domain structure of the four velvet-domain proteins and crystal structure of the velvet domain of VosA in A. nidulans. VD, velvet-domain; NLS, nuclear localization signal; NES, nuclear export signal; PEST, proline- (P), glutamic acid- (E), serine- (S), and threonine-rich (T) region; TAD, transcription activation domain.
