= Central European Highlands =

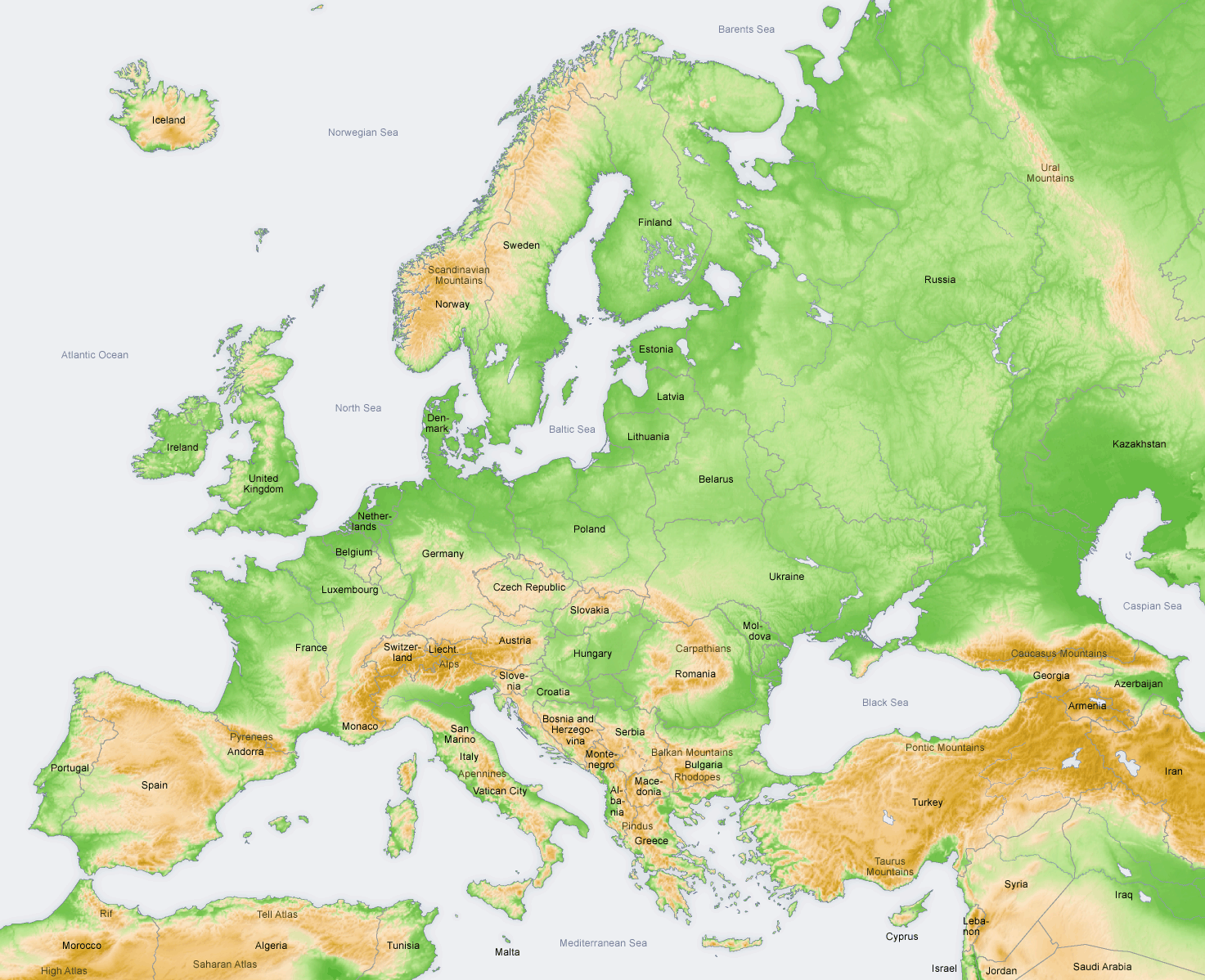

The Central European Highlands consist of the high mountains of the Alpine Mountains and the Carpathian Mountains systems and also mountainous ranges of medium elevation (c. 1,000–2,000 m (3,300–6,600 ft)), e.g. those belonging to the Bohemian Massif, still prevailingly of mountainous character.

Both types of mountains act as "water towers". Their high elevation brings about high precipitation and low evaporation, and the resulting surplus of water balance feeds large European rivers and other important water sources. Beside the mountains, large areas of Central Europe are occupied by highlands or peneplains of lower altitude (400–800 m (1,300–2,600 ft)) in which the surplus of annual water balance is less noticeable.

It includes the uplands of Central Europe and southwestern Europe. Blocks of elevated highlands are found as dissected plateaus and faulted valleys. These are the Meseta Central of the Iberian Peninsula, the Massif Central of France, the highlands of Brittany and south-west Ireland, the Rhine highlands, the Vosges, the Black Forest of the Rhine and so on.
