= List of cartographers =

Cartography is the study of map making and, cartographers are map makers.

== Before 1400 ==
Modern rendering of Anaximander's 6th-century BC world map

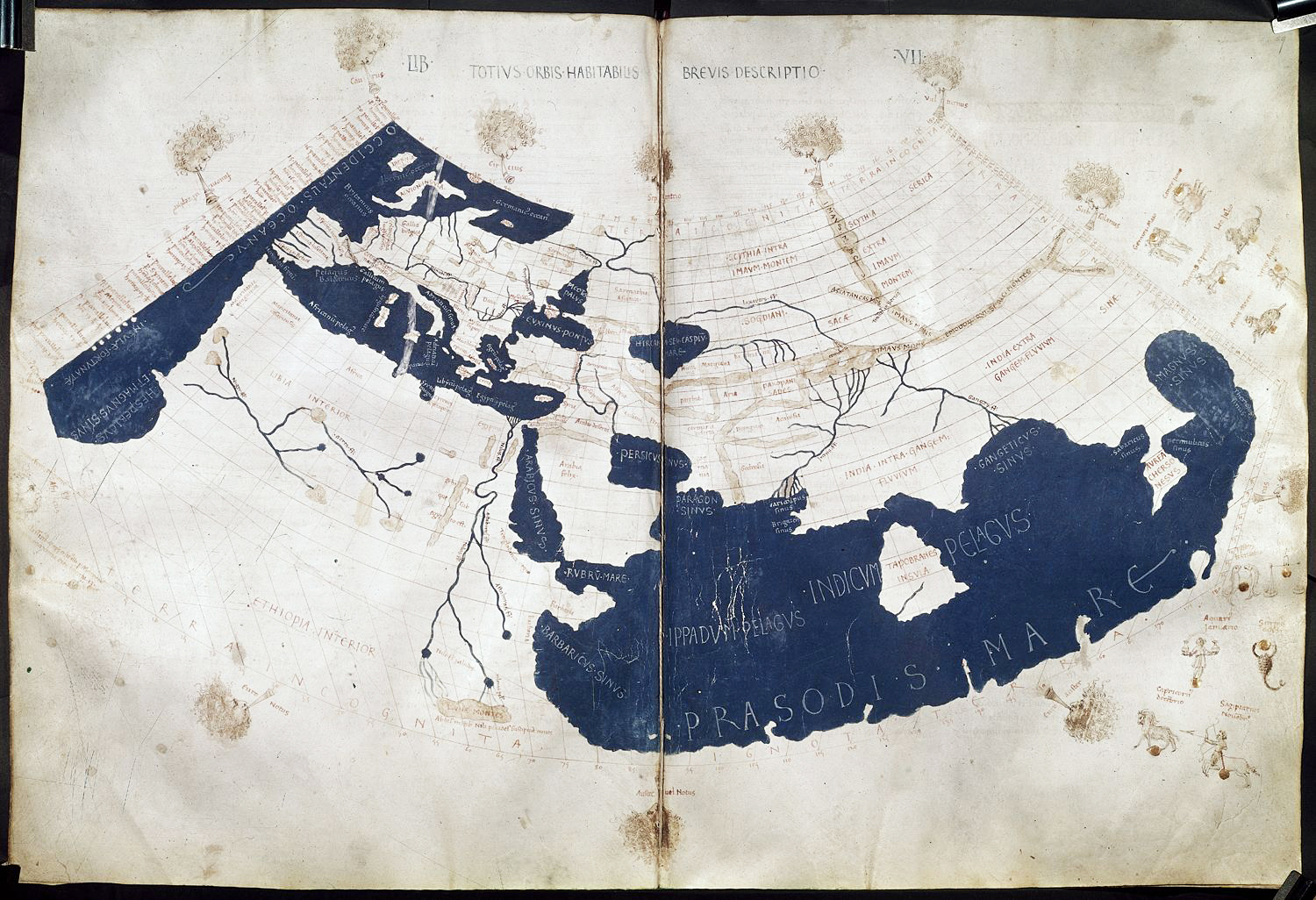
Ptolemy's 150 CE world map (as redrawn in the 15th century)

- Anaximander, Greek Anatolia (610 BC–546 BC), first to attempt making a map of the known world
- Dicaearchus, Magna Graecia (c. 350 BC–285 BC), philosopher, cartographer, geographer, mathematician, author
- Angelino Dulcert (14th century), author of the earliest known Mallorcan portolan charts of the Mediterranean
- Ende, Spain (c. 1000 AD), illustrator, cartographer, nun
- Eratosthenes, Ptolemaic Egypt (276 BC–194 BC), Greek scientist, mathematician, geographer, and cartographer
- Gyōki, Japan (668–749), Buddhist monk, cartographer, surveyor, and civil engineer,
- Hecataeus of Miletus, Greek Anatolia (550 BC–476 BC), geographer, cartographer, and early ethnographer
- Hipparchus, Greek Anatolia (190 BC–120 BC), astronomer, cartographer, geographer
- al-Idrisi, Sicily (1100–1166), Arab cartographer, geographer and traveller
- Isidore of Seville, Hispania (560–636)
- al-Khwārazmī, Caliphate (9th century), Persian cartographer, geographer, and polymath
- Liu An, China (179 BC–122 BC), geographer, cartographer, author of the Huainanzi
- Marinus of Tyre, Roman Syria (c. AD 70–130), Greek geographer, cartographer and mathematician, who founded mathematical geography
- Pei Xiu (224–271), Chinese geographer and cartographer
- Maximus Planudes, Byzantine Empire (13th century), monk credited with restoring the texts and maps of Ptolemy
- Ptolemy, Ptolemaic Egypt (c. 85–165), Greek astronomer, cartographer, and geographer
- Shen Kuo, China (1031–1095), polymath scientist and statesman, author of the Dream Pool Essays, which included a large atlas of China and foreign regions, and also made a three-dimensional raised-relief map
- Su Song, China (1020–1101), horologist and engineer; as a Song dynasty diplomat, he used his knowledge of cartography and map-making to solve territorial border disputes with the rival Liao dynasty
- Pietro Vesconte, Genoese cartographer, author of the oldest signed Portolan chart (1311)

== 15th century ==
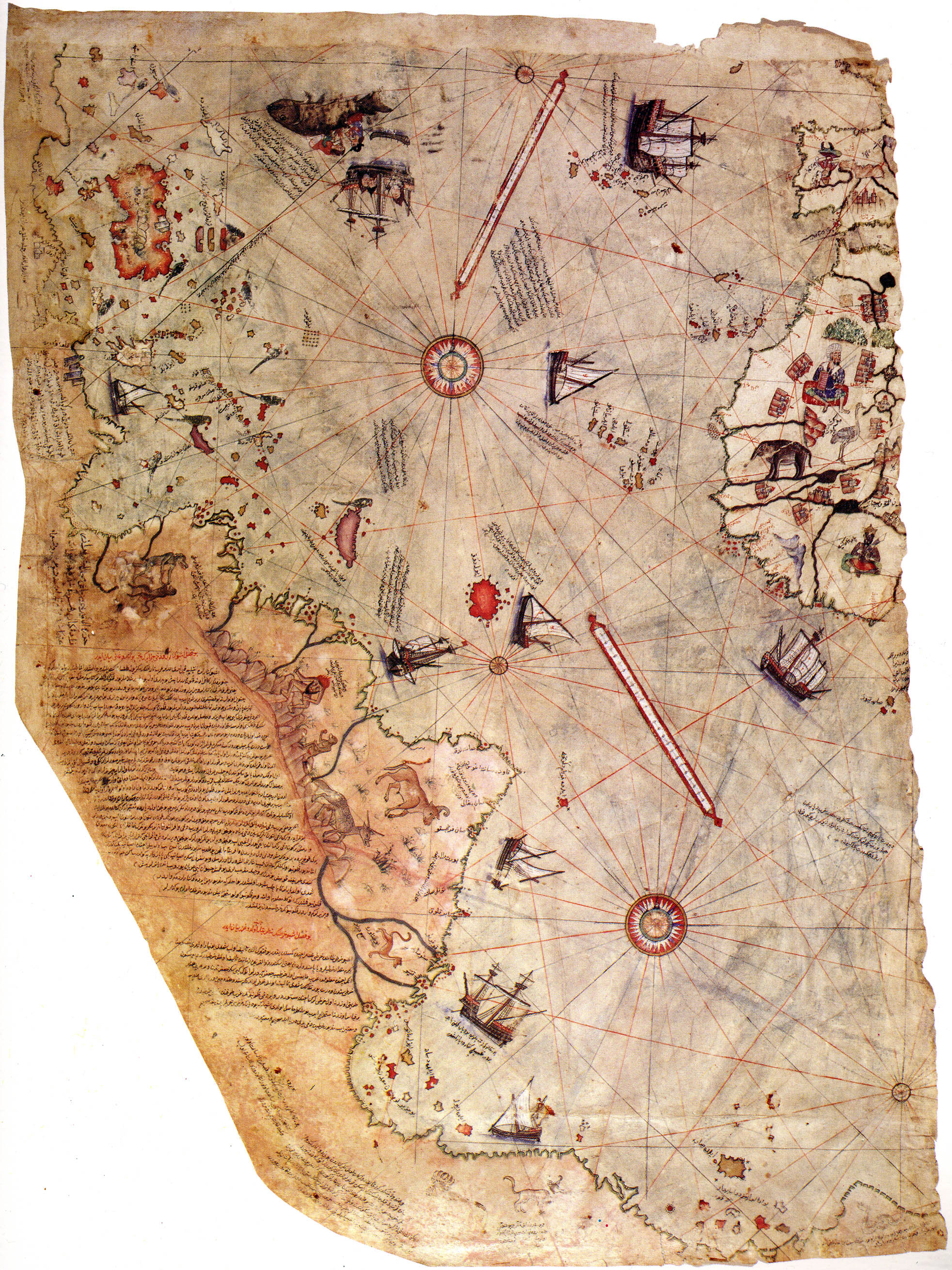
First world map of Piri Reis

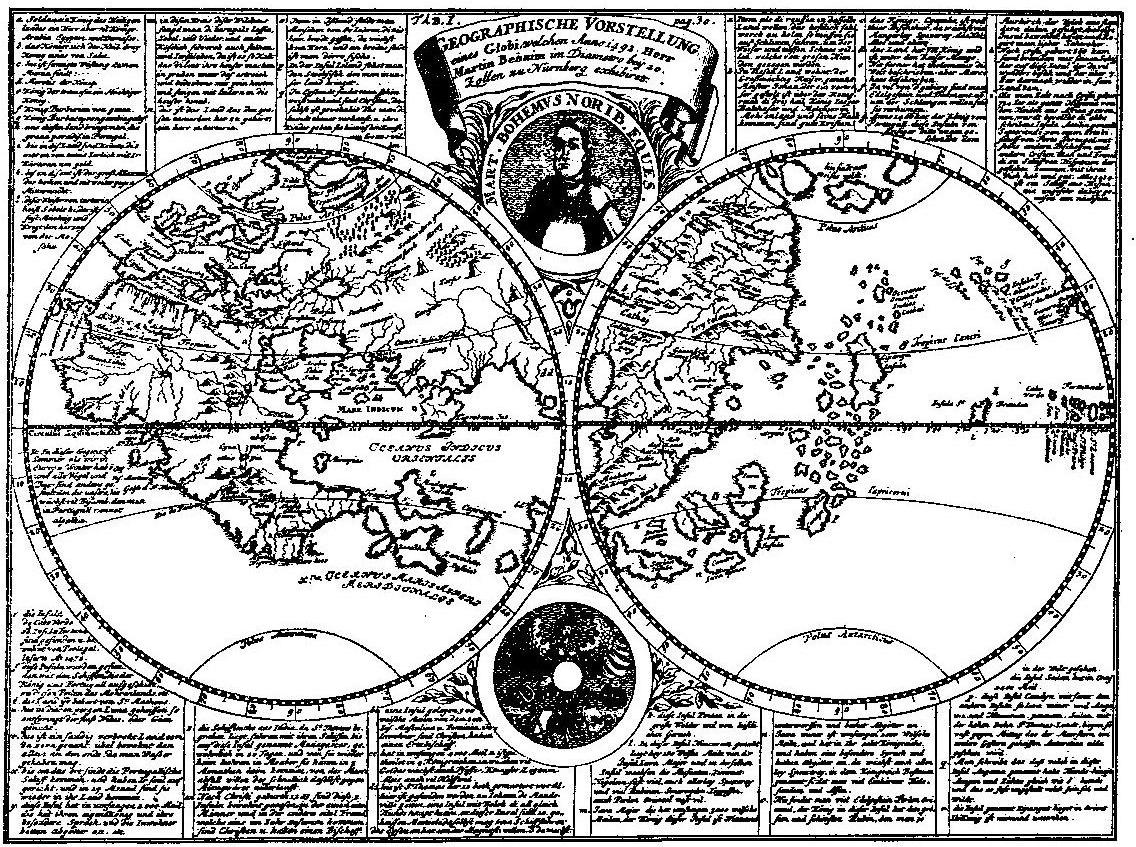
Martin Behaim's 1492 world map

- Jacobus Angelus, Florence, translated Ptolemy into Latin c. 1406
- Martin Behaim (Germany, 1436–1507)
- Grazioso Benincasa (15th century), from Ancona, author of several portolan charts of the Mediterranean
- Benedetto Bordone (Venetian Republic 1460–1551)
- Sebastian Cabot (1476–1557), Venetian explorer
- Leonardo da Vinci (Italy, 1452–1519)
- Gabriel de Valseca (15th century), Mallorcan, author of several portolan charts of the Mediterranean
- Erhard Etzlaub (1460–1532)
- Donnus Nicholas Germanus (Germany, fl. 1460–1475)
- Henricus Martellus Germanus (Germany, fl. 1480–1496)
- Olaus Magnus (Olof Månsson) (Sweden, 1490–1557), published Carta Marina in 1539
- Fra Mauro (Venice, c. 1459)
- Piri Reis (Dardanelles, Ottoman Empire, 1465–1554/1555), author of the Kitab-ı Bahriye
- Johannes Ruysch (Netherlands, c. 1466–1530), explorer, cartographer, astronomer, manuscript illustrator and painter
- Hartmann Schedel (Germany, 1440–1514)
- Amerigo Vespucci (Republic of Florence, 1454–1512)
- Martin Waldseemüller (Germany, c. 1470–c. 1521/1522)
- Johannes Werner (Germany, 1466–1528), refined and promoted the Werner map projection

== 16th century ==
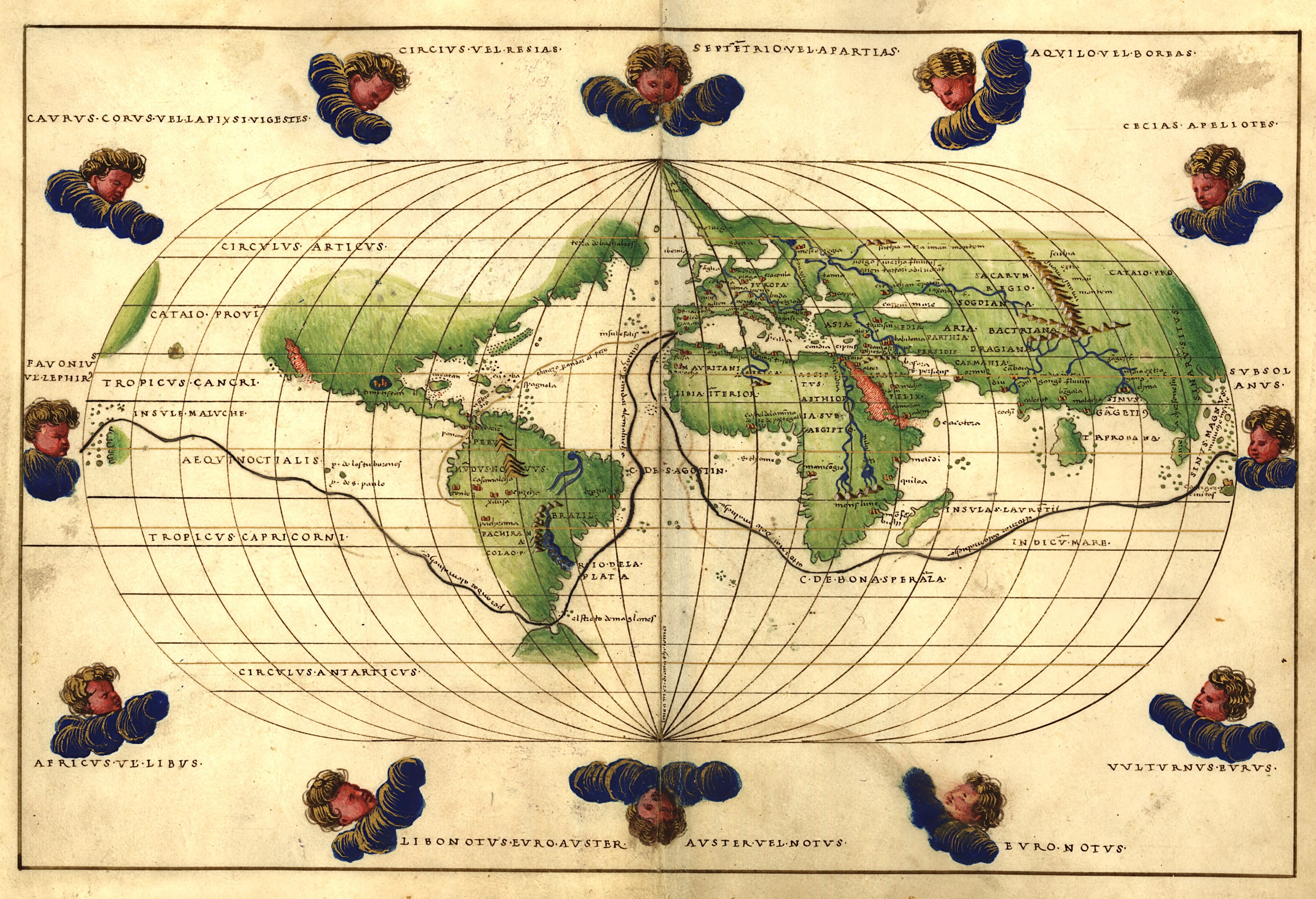
Battista Agnese's 1544 world map

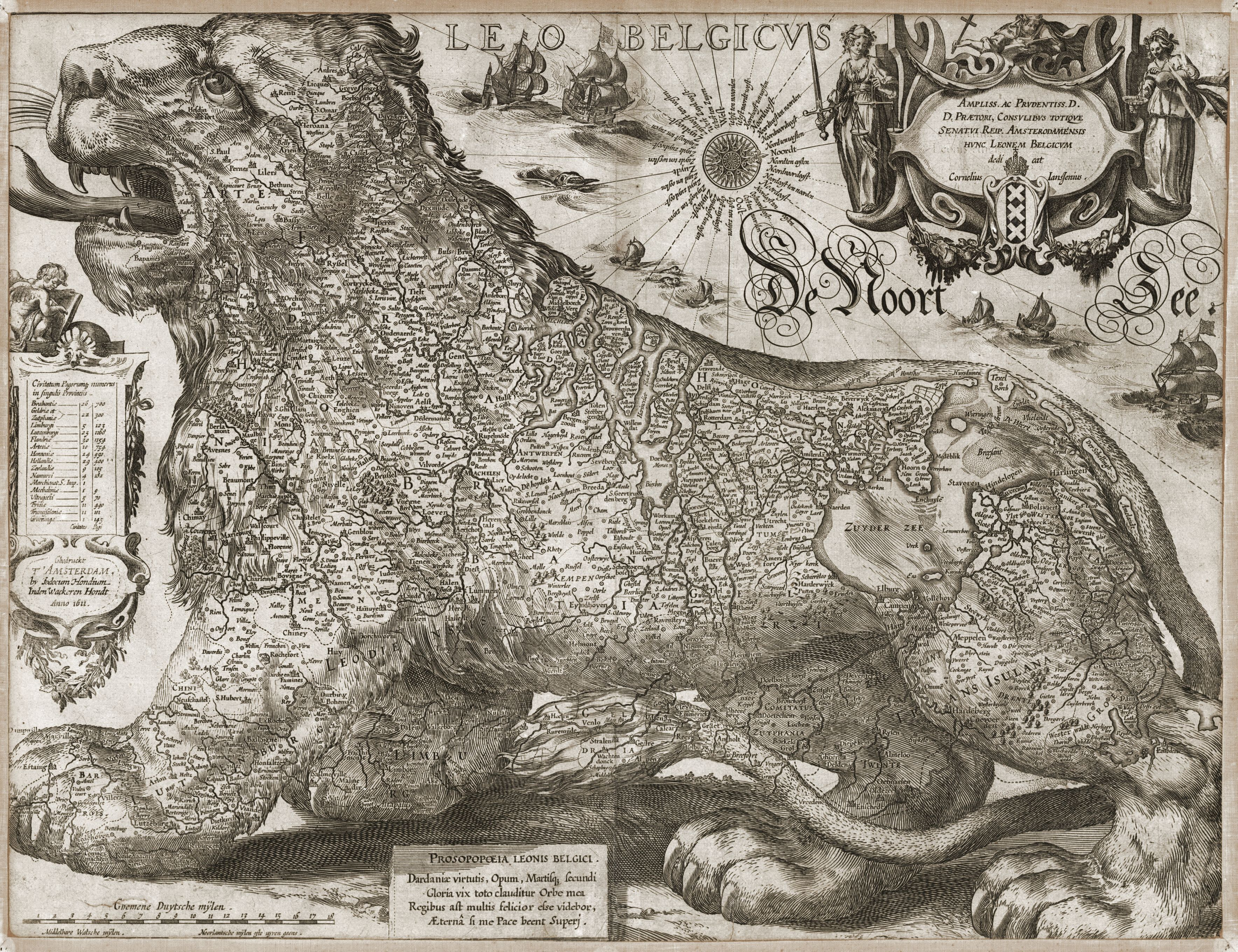
Jodocus Hondius' Leo Belgicus (1611)

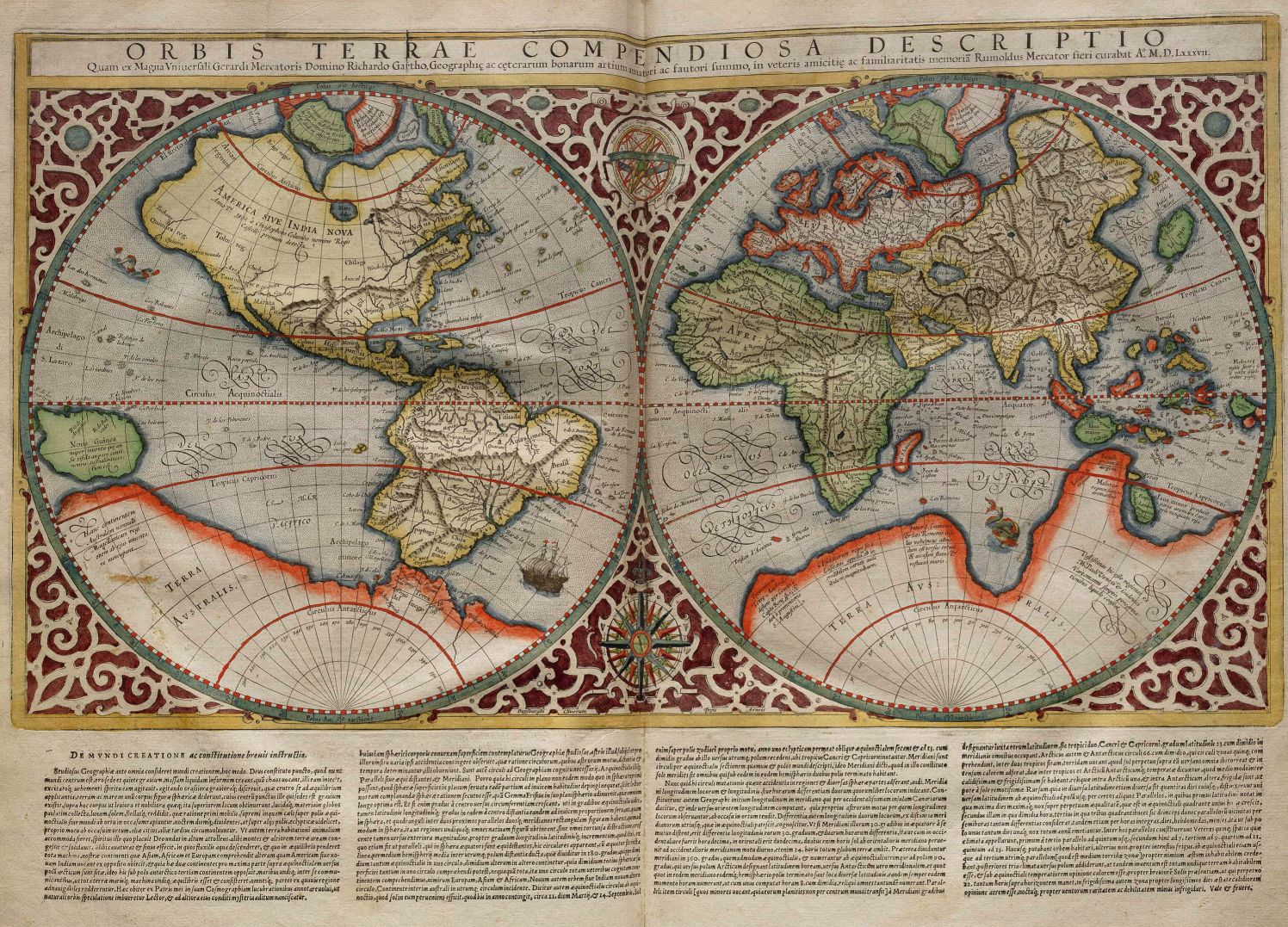
Gerardus Mercator's 1587 world map

World map from the Theatrum Orbis Terrarum by Abraham Ortelius

- Giovanni Battista Agnese (c. 1500–1564), Genoese, cartographer, author of numerous nautical atlases
- Hacı Ahmet, Ottoman Tunisian cartographer, translated 16th-c. map into Turkish for the Ottoman Empire
- Peter Apian (1495–1552), also known as Peter Bienewitz, German geographer and astronomer, author of the Apianus projection
- Philipp Apian (1531–1589)
- Joost Janszoon Bilhamer (Netherlands, 1541–1590)
- Willem Janszoon Blaeu (Netherlands, 1571–1638), father of Joan Blaeu
- Giovanni Battista Boazio, mapped Sir Francis Drake's voyage to the West Indies and America
- Georg Braun (Germany, 1541–1622), cartographer
- Anders Bure (Sweden, 1571–1646), founder of Swedish cartography
- Hernando de los Ríos Coronel (1559–1621?), cosmographer and cartographer, mapped Taiwan (Isla Hermosa), Luzon and part of the Chinese coast
- Jacob Roelofs van Deventer (Netherlands, c. 1510/15–1575)
- Fernão Vaz Dourado (India, c. 1520–c. 1580), Portuguese cartographer of the school initiated by Lopo Homem
- Oronce Finé (France, 1494–1555)
- Gemma Frisius (or Reiner Gemma) (Netherlands, 1508–1555)
- Diego Gutiérrez (Spain, ?), published a map entitled Americae Sive Quartae Orbis Partis Nova Et Exactissima Descriptio with printer Hieronymus Cock; first map with toponym "California" and first appearance of a word for "Appalachia," as the term "Apalchen"
- Jan Van Hanswijk (Netherlands, fl. 1594)
- Martin Helwig (Germany, 1516–1574)
- Augustin Hirschvogel (Germany, 1503–1553)
- Diogo Homem (Portugal 1521–1576), cartographer, son of Lopo Homem
- Lopo Homem (Portugal?–1565), co-author, with the Reinel family, of the well-known Miller Atlas
- Jodocus Hondius (Netherlands, 1563–1612)
- Johannes Honterus (Transylvania, 1498–1549)
- Gerard de Jode (Netherlands, 1509–1591)
- Joan Martines (Messina, Sicily, died 1591)
- Urbano Monti (Italy, 1544–1613)
- Jacques le Moyne (France, c. 1533–1588)
- Guillaume Le Testu (France, c. 1509–1573)
- Gerardus Mercator (Netherlands, 1512–1594)
- Sebastian Münster (Germany, 1488–1552)
- Abraham Ortelius (France, 1527–1598), generally recognized as the creator of the first modern atlas
- Petrus Plancius (Netherlands, 1552–1622)
- Timothy Pont (Scotland, 1565–1614)
- Jorge Reinel (Portugal c. 1502–c. 1572), Portuguese cartographer, son of Pedro Reinel
- Pedro Reinel (Portugal ?–c. 1542), author of the oldest signed Portuguese nautical chart
- Diogo Ribeiro (Portugal, ?–Sevilha, 1533), author of the first known planisphere with a graduated Equator (1527)
- Christopher Saxton (England, born c. 1540)
- John Speed (England, 1542–1629)
- Luís Teixeira (Portugal, ?–?), author of an important atlas of Brazil
- Bartolomeu Velho (Portugal, ?–1568), cosmographer and cartographer
- Lucas Janszoon Waghenaer (Netherlands, 1533/34–1605/06), driver, cartographer
- Edward Wright (England, 1561–1615), mathematician and cartographer

== 17th century ==
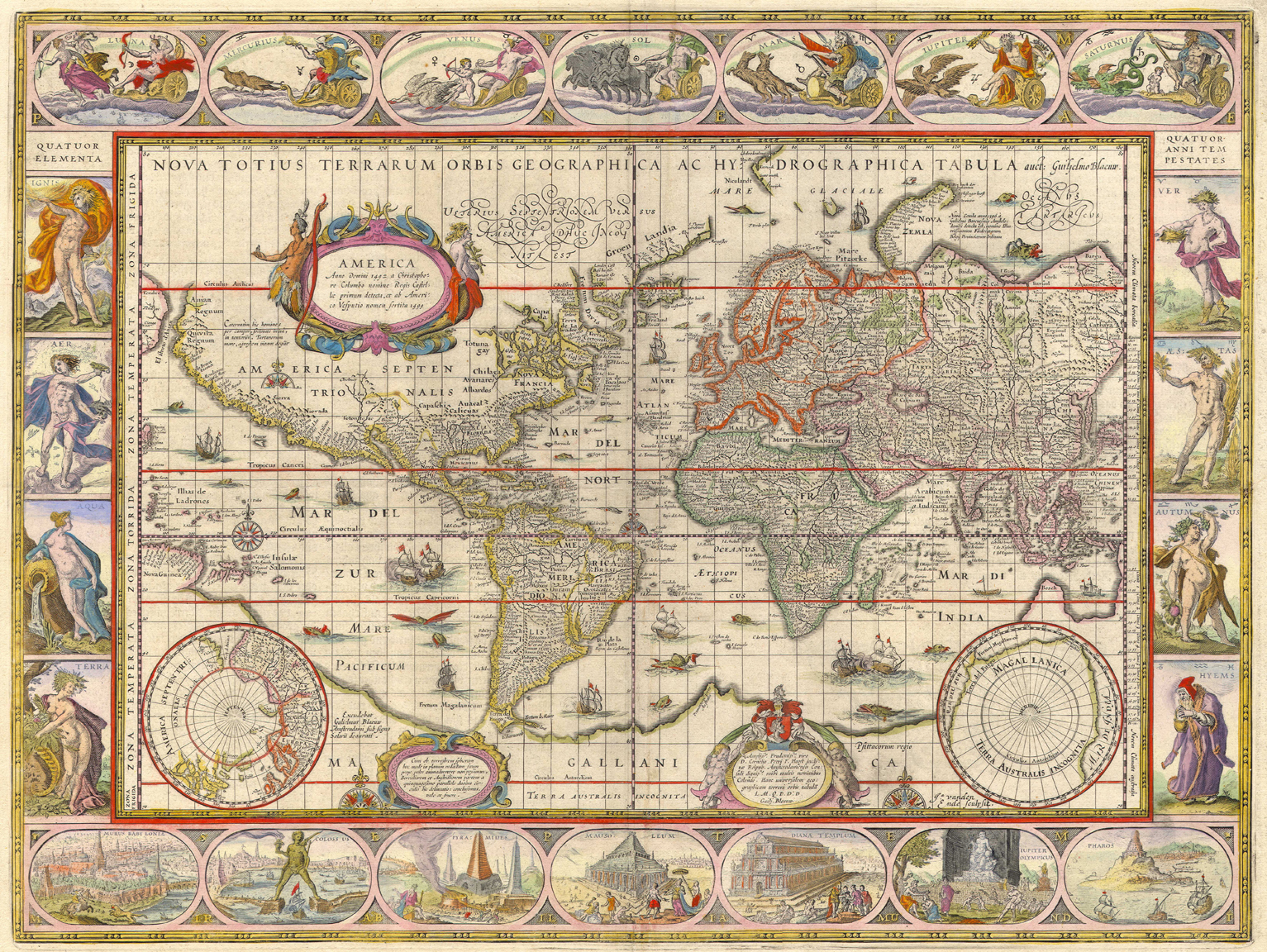
Willem Blaeu and Johannes Blaeu's 1606–1626 world map

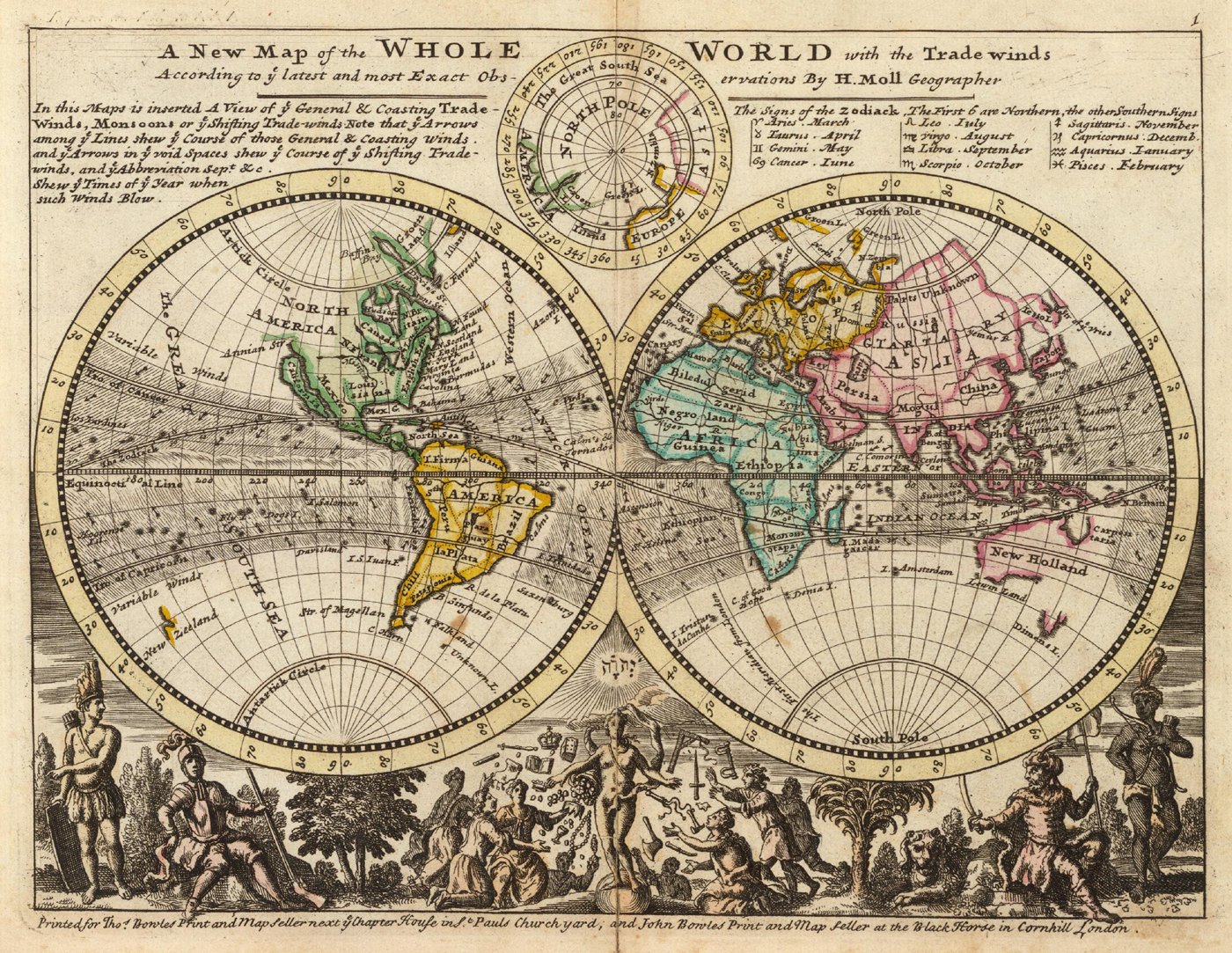
Herman Moll's A new map of the whole world with the trade winds (1736)

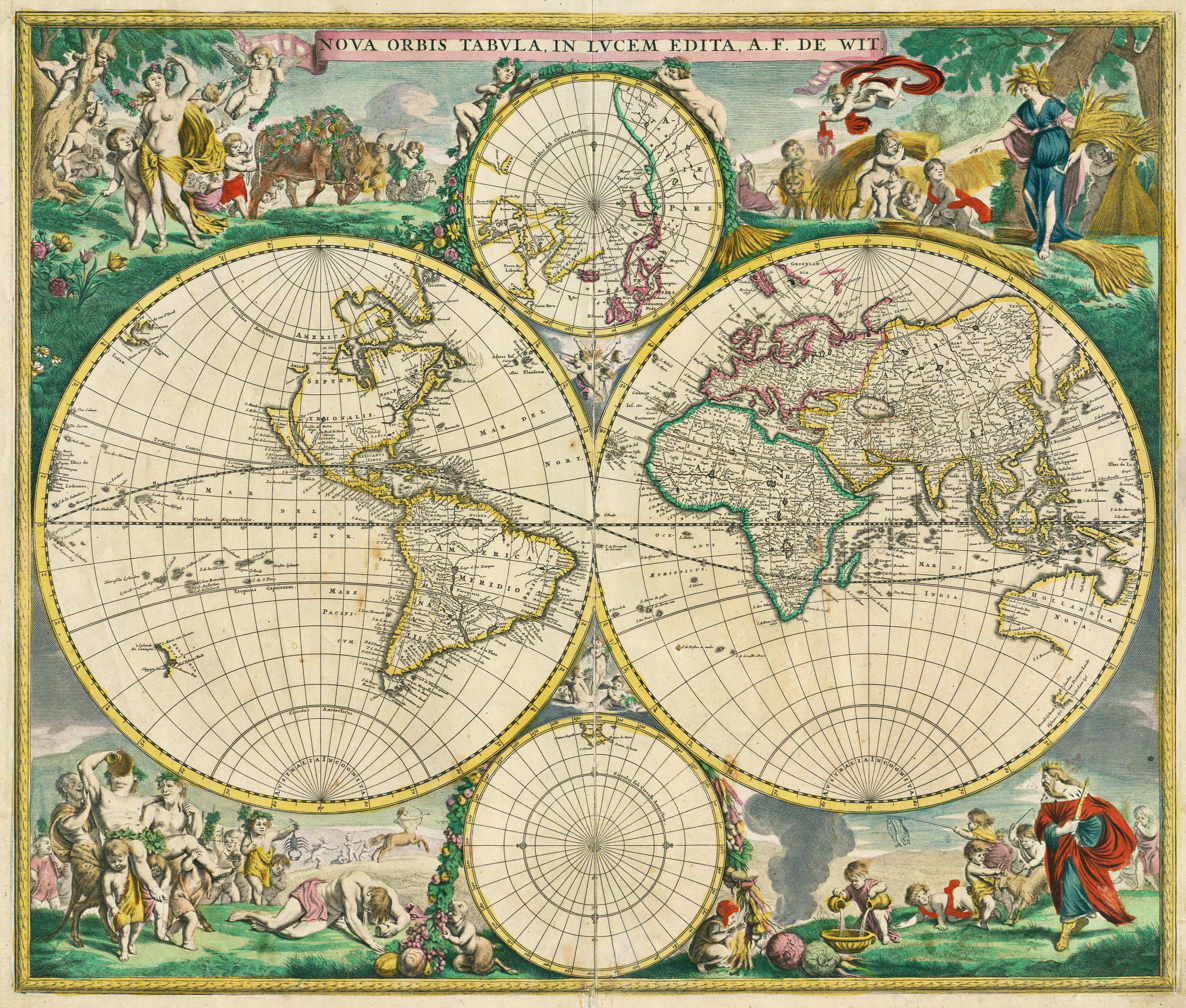
Frederik de Wit's 1670 world map

- Pieter van der Aa (Netherlands, 1659–1733)
- João Teixeira Albernaz I (Portugal, died c. 1664), prolific cartographer, son of Luís Teixeira
- Pedro Teixeira Albernaz (Portugal, c. 1595–1662), Portuguese cartographer author of an important atlas of the Iberian Peninsula and a map of Portugal (1656)
- Guillaume Le Vasseur de Beauplan (France, c. 1600–1673), French cartographer who created first descriptive map of Ukraine
- François Berthelot (France), cartographer of the Mediterranean Sea
- Johannes Blaeu (Netherlands, 1596–1673)
- Emanuel Bowen (1693/4–1767), engraver and map maker
- Giovanni Cassini (a.k.a. Cassini I, Italy & France, 1625–1712)
- Jacques Cassini (a.k.a. Cassini II, France, 1677–1756)
- Greenville Collins (British, 1643–1694)
- Vincenzo Coronelli (Venetian, 1650–1718)
- Guillaume Delisle (French, 1675–1726)
- Hessel Gerritsz (Netherlands, 1581–1632), cartographer for the VOC
- Isaak de Graaff (Netherlands, 1668–1743), cartographer for the VOC
- Johann Homann (Germany, 1664–1724), geographer
- Henricus Hondius (Netherlands, 1597–1651)
- Willem Hondius (Netherlands, 1598–1652/58)
- Johannes Janssonius (Netherlands, 1588–1664)
- Johannes van Keulen (Netherlands, 1654–1715)
- Joannes de Laet (Netherlands, 1581–1649)
- Michael van Langren (Netherlands, 1600–1675)
- Alain Manesson Mallet (France, 1630–1706)
- Matthäus Merian Sr. (Switzerland, 1593–1650) and Jr. (Switzerland, 1621–1687)
- David de Meyne (Netherlands, c. 1569–1620)
- Herman Moll (Germany?/England, 1654–1732)
- Robert Morden (England, 1650–1703)
- Giovan Battista Nicolosi (Italy, 1610–1670)
- Dirck Rembrantsz van Nierop (Netherlands, 1610–1682), cartographer, mathematician and astronomist
- Jean-Baptiste Nolin (France, c.1657–1708)
- John Ogilby (Scotland, 1600–1676)
- Nicolas Sanson (France, 1600–1667)
- Peter Schenk the Elder (Germany, 1660–1718/19)
- Johannes Vingboons (Netherlands, 1616/17–1670), cartographer and aquarellist
- Georg Matthäus Vischer (Austria, 1628–1696), cartographer, topographer and engraver
- Claes Jansz Visscher (Netherlands, 1587–1652)
- Nicolaes Visscher I (Netherlands, 1618–1679)
- Anna van Westerstee Beek (Netherlands, 1657–1717), Dutch cartographer, produced city and battle maps
- Frederik de Wit (Netherlands, 1610/16–1698)
- Nicolaes Witsen (Netherlands, 1641–1717), diplomat, cartographer, writer and mayor of Amsterdam

== 18th century ==
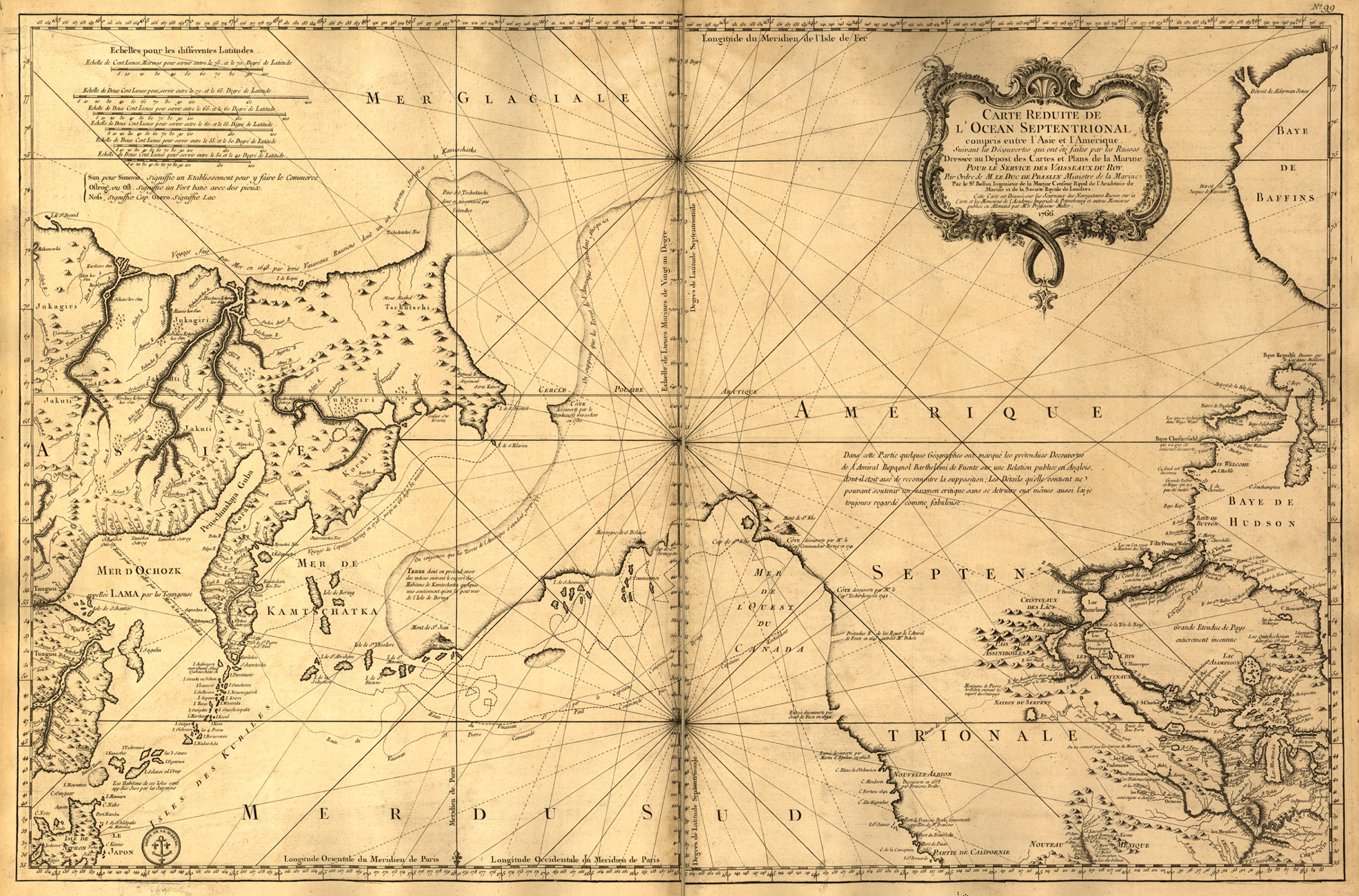
Jacques-Nicolas Bellin: Carte réduite de l'océan septentrional..., from: L'hydrographie françoise, Paris 1766

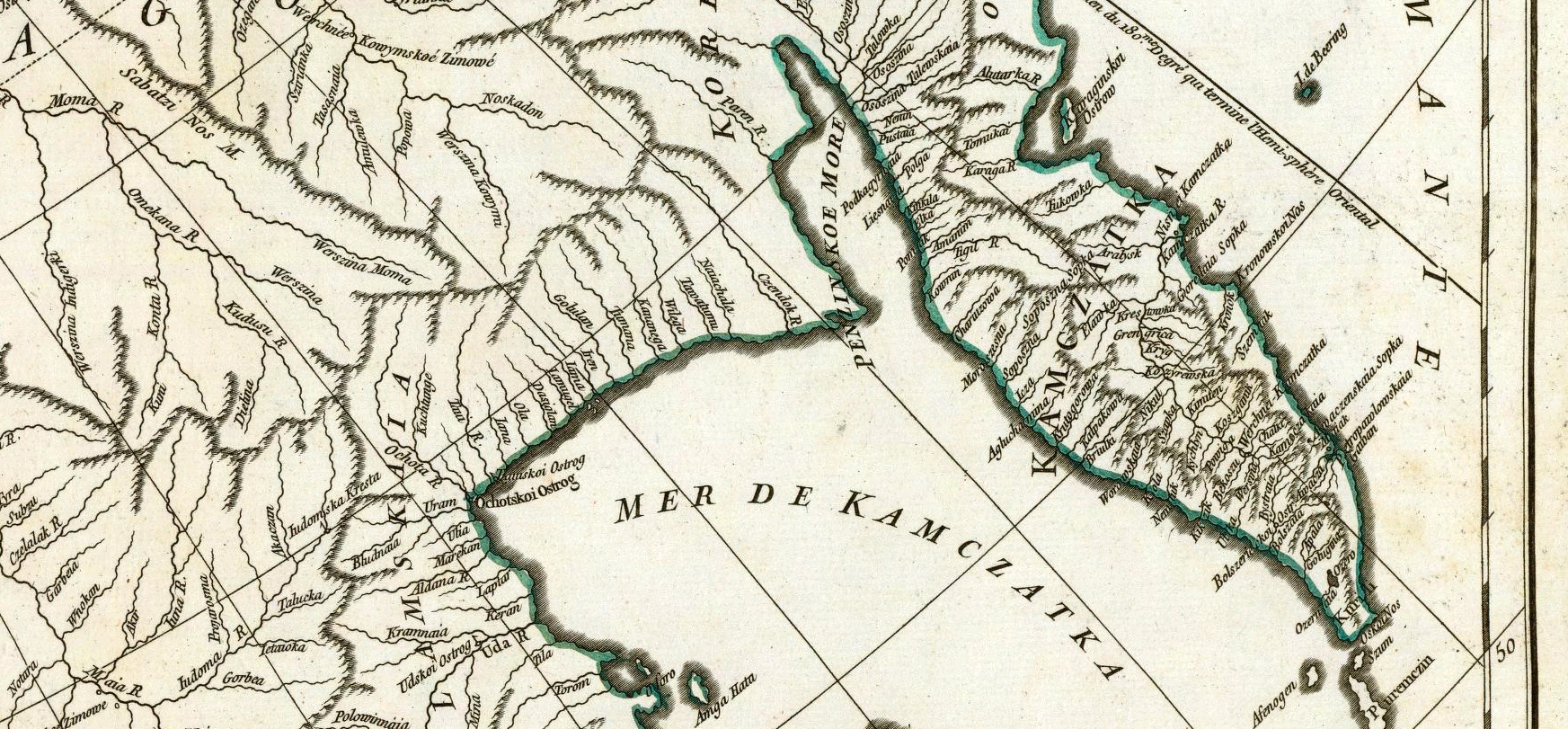
Jean Baptiste Bourguignon d'Anville: Troisième partie de la carte d'Asie, contenant la Sibérie, et quelques autres parties de la Tartarie, Paris (1753)

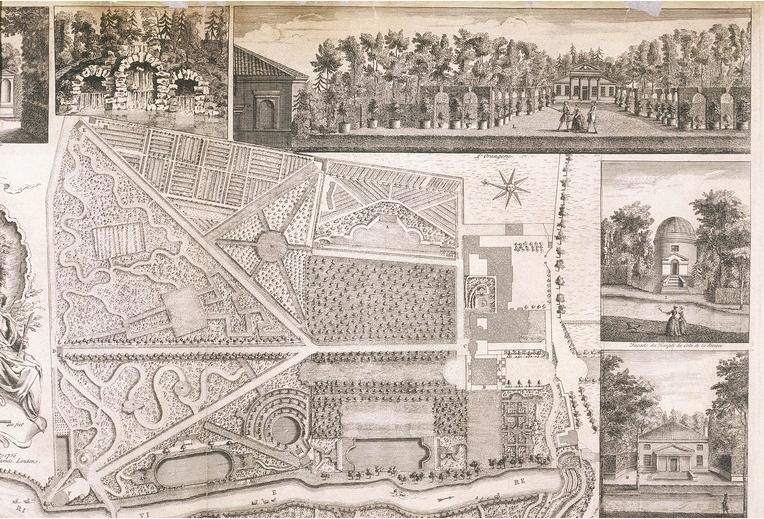
Plan du Jardin & Vue des Maisons de Chiswick, 1736, by John Rocque V&A Museum no. E.352-1944

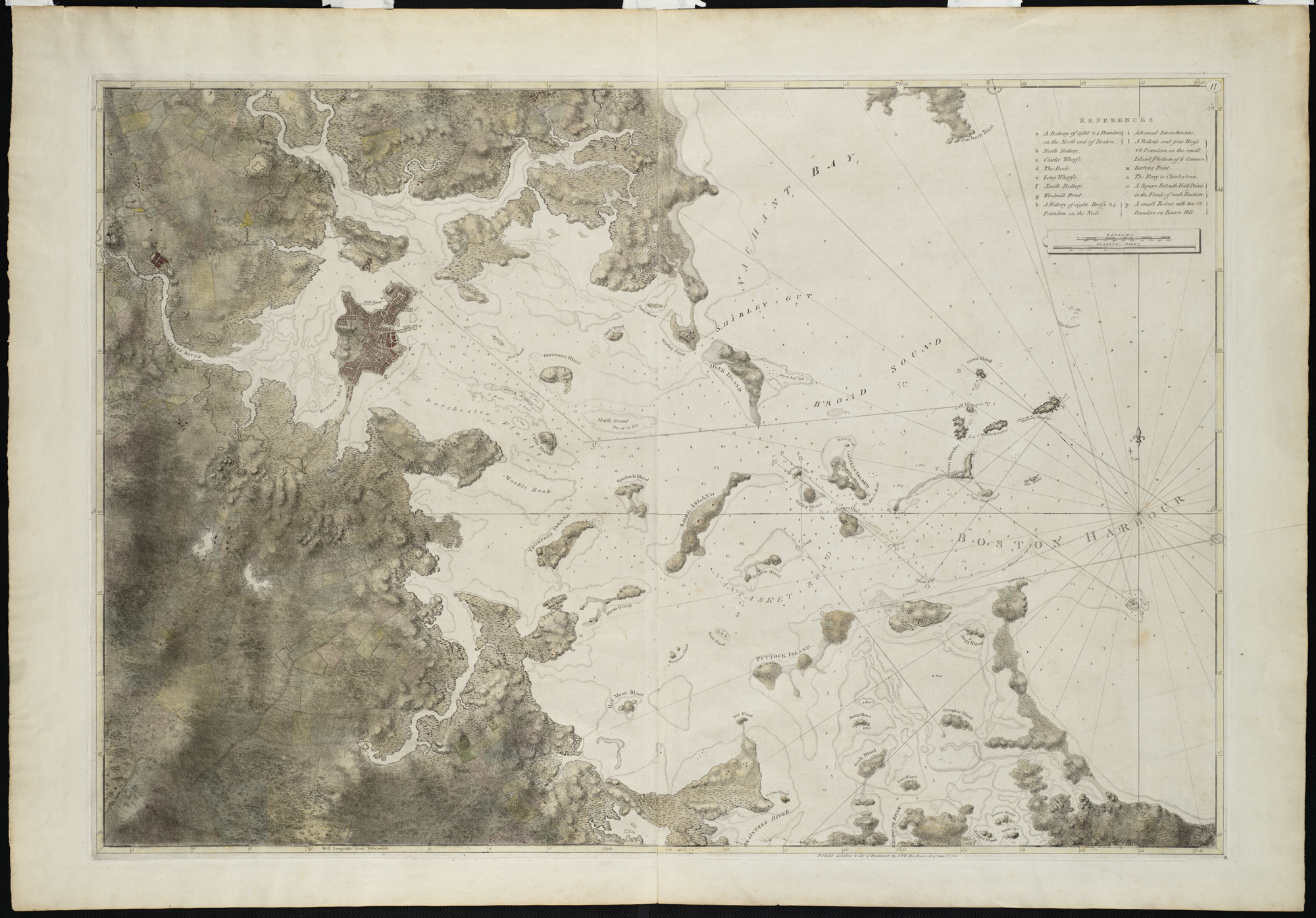
A survey of Boston Harbor from Atlantic Neptune by Colonel Joseph Frederick Wallet DesBarres

- John James Abert (United States, 1788–1863), headed the Corps of Topographical Engineers for 32 years and organized the mapping of the American West
- Anders Åkerman (Sweden, 1721/23–1778), first globemaker in Sweden
- John Arrowsmith (England, 1790–1873), member of the Arrowsmith family of geographers
- Louis Albert Guislain Bacler d'Albe (France, 1761–1824), also artist and longtime strategic advisor to Napoleon
- Agostino Codazzi (Italy, 1793–1858)
- John Lodge Cowley, cartographer, mathematician and geographer
- Joseph Frederick Wallet DesBarres (1721–1824), created Atlantic Neptune
- John Gibson, map c. 1758
- Jacques-Nicolas Bellin (1703–1772), chief cartographer to the French navy
- William Bligh (England, 1754–57 December 1817), Sship's master during the infamous Bounty mutiny and noted free-hand cartographer
- Rigobert Bonne (France, 1727–1795), royal cartographer to France in the office of the Hydrographer at Depot de la Marine
- Jean Baptiste Bourguignon d'Anville (France, 1697–1782)
- Abel Buell (1742–1822), published the first map of the new United States created by an American
- Catharina Buijs (1714–1781), Dutch cartographer for the Dutch East India Company
- Dimitrie Cantemir (Moldavia and Russia, 1673–1723)
- Jean-Dominique Cassini (a.k.a. Cassini IV, France, 1748–1845)
- César-François Cassini de Thury (a.k.a. Cassini III, France, 1714–1784)
- Thomas Frederick Colby (England, 1784–1852)
- James Cook (Captain RN) (1728–1779), navigator and naval chart maker
- Simeon De Witt (1756–1834), successor to Robert Erskine and surveyor-general of the State of New York
- Louis Isidore Duperrey (French, 1786–1865)
- Johann Friedrich Endersch (Germany, fl. 1755)
- Colonel Robert Erskine (1735–1780), geographer and surveyor-general of the Continental Army during the American Revolution
- William Faden (England, 1749–1836), successor to Thomas Jefferys
- Joseph de Ferraris (1726–1814), Austrian cartographer of the Austrian Netherlands
- Louis Feuillée (France, 1660–1732)
- Matthew Flinders (British, 1774–1814), Royal Navy officer; circumnavigated Australia and made exploration of the Australian coastline
- Björn Gunnlaugsson (Iceland, 1788–1876)
- Samuel Gustaf Hermelin (Sweden, 1744–1820)
- Pierre Jacotin (France, 1765–1829)
- Thomas Jefferys (England, c. 1710–1771), geographer of King George III of the United Kingdom
- Thomas Kitchin (1718–1784), London-based cartographer and engraver of maps of England, greater Europe, and parts of the British Empire; at one time held the titles "Senior Hydrographer to His Majesty" and "Senior Engraver to His Royal Highness the Duke of York"
- Fielding Lucas, Jr. (c. 1781–1854), of the Lucas Brothers, Baltimore, US
- Murdoch McKenzie (Scotland, died 1797)
- Edme Mentelle (France, 1730–1816)
- Henri Michelot (France, born c. 1664), Marseilles, France, hydrographer and pilot of the Royal Galley
- John Mitchell (1711–1768), colonial British American mapmaker
- Thomas Livingstone Mitchell (England, 1792–1855)
- Robert Moresby (England, 1794–1863)
- Thomas Moule (England, 1784–1851)
- William Mudge (England, 1762–1820)
- Friedrich Christoph Müller (Germany, 1751–1808)
- Carlton Osgood (United States, †1816)
- Adriaan Reland (Netherlands, 1676–1718), linguist and cartographer
- Thomas Richardson (Scotland)
- John Rocque (England, 1709–1762)
- William Roy (England, 1726–1790)
- John Senex (1690–1740), engraver, publisher, surveyor and geographer to Queen Anne
- Matthäus Seutter (Germany, 1678–1757)
- Philip Johan von Strahlenberg (1676–1747)
- Inō Tadataka (Japan, 1745–1818), Surveyor and cartographer who completed the first surveyed map of Japan
- David Thompson (British–Canadian, 1770–1857)
- Daniel-Charles Trudaine (France, 1703–1769)
- Philippe Vandermaelen (Belgium, 1795–1869)
- Dider Robert de Vaugondy (France, 1688–1766)
- George Washington (United States, 1732–1799), first president of the U.S.; cartographer
- Emma Willard (United States, 1787–1870), women's rights activist and education reformer
- James Wilson (United States, 1763–1835), first maker of globes in the United States

== 19th century ==
Abraham Bradley's U.S. postal route map of 1804

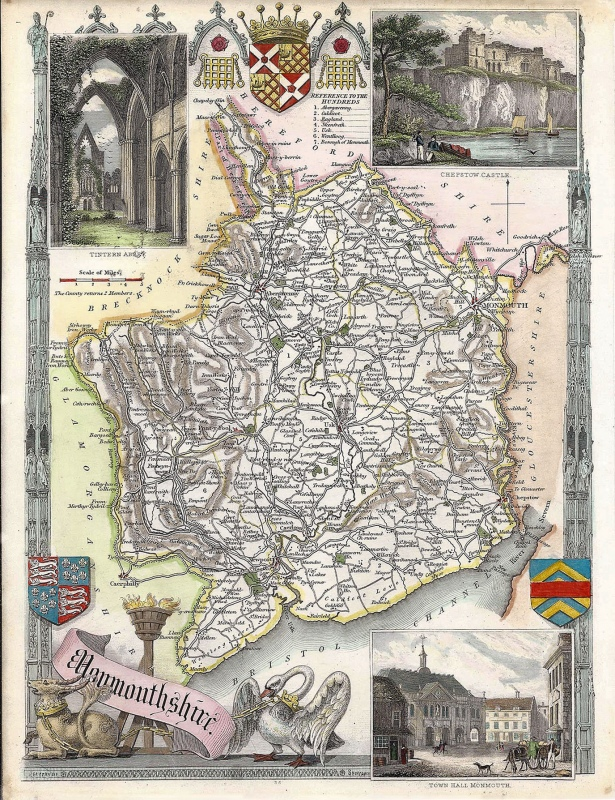
Moule's map of the hundreds of Monmouthshire, c. 1831

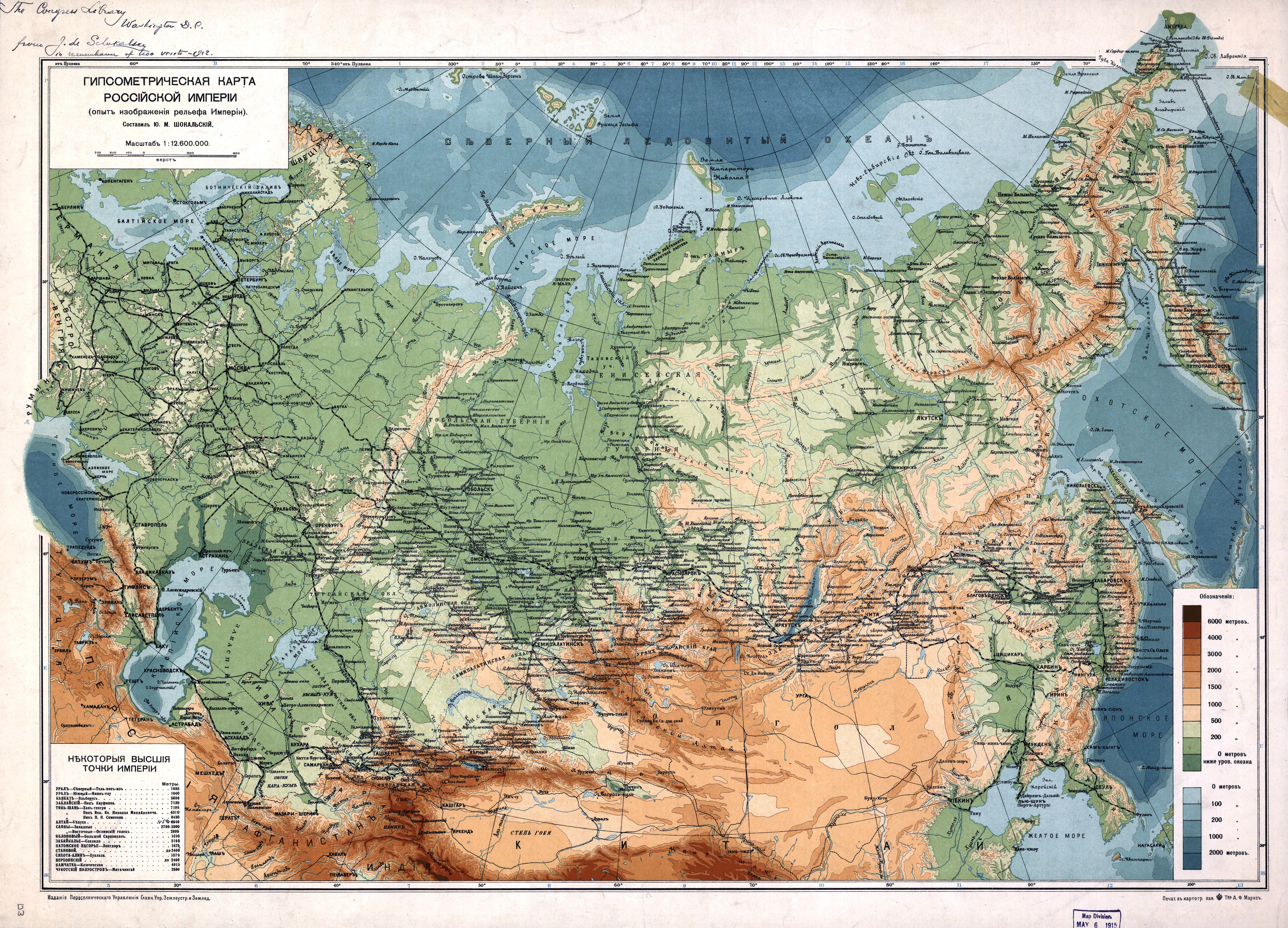
A 1912 map of the Russian Empire by Yuly Shokalsky

- Robert Aitken of Beith. born c. 1786
- John Bartholomew the elder (26 April 1805 – 8 April 1861), Scottish cartographer and engraver
- Henry Peter Bosse (Germany/United States, 1844–1903), also photographer and civil engineer
- Abraham Bradley Jr. (1767–1838), created first postal road maps of the United States
- George Bradshaw (England, 1801–1853)
- Bernard J. S. Cahill (1867–1944), inventor of octahedral "Butterfly Map" of the world
- Ambrose F. Church (died 1920), mapmaker in Nova Scotia, Canada
- J. H. Colton (United States, 1800–1893)
- George Comer (1858–1937)
- Emmor Cope, Gettysburg Battlefield cartographer and first Gettysburg National Military Park superintendent
- James Ireland Craig (1868–1952), inventor of the Craig retroazimuthal projection, otherwise known as the Mecca projection
- Carl Diercke (1842–1913)
- Max Eckert-Greifendorff (Germany, 1868–1938)
- Percy Fawcett (1867–1925), British explorer of South America
- Mizuki Feido (1833–1891), Japan. Assistant to European geographical expeditions
- Thaddeus Mortimer Fowler (1842–1922), American producer of pictorial maps
- James Gardner
- Charles E. Goad (1848–1910), English Canadian cartographer and pioneer of insurance maps
- Eugenia Wheeler Goff (United States, 1844–1922), combined history, resources, and geography
- John Paul Goode (1862–1932), created the "Evil Mercator" and Goode’s World Atlas
- Hermann Haack (Germany, 1872–1966)
- Charles F. Hoffmann (Germany/United States, 1838–1913)
- William Hughes FRGS (1818 – 21 May 1876), English geographer, mapmaker, cartographer and author
- Eduard Imhof (1895–1986), oversaw the Schweizerischer Mittelschulatlas, the atlas used in Swiss
- Florence Kelley (United States, 1859–1932), political reformer, director of the Chicago portion of the Hull House Maps and Papers
- Peter Kosler (Slovenia, 1824–1879), lawyer, geographer, politician, manufacturer
- Lilian Lancaster (1852–1939), British creator of anthropomorphic maps
- Rudolf Leuzinger (Switzerland, 1826–1896), known for mountain landscapes and geologic forms and the first to produce terrain maps in color lithography
- Victor Adolphe Malte-Brun (France, 1816–1889)
- Matsuura Takeshirō (Japan, 1818–1888), explorer, cartographer, writer, painter, priest, and antiquarian
- Matthew Fontaine Maury (United States, 1806–1873), U.S. Navy officer; also oceanographer, meteorologist, cartographer, author, geologist, and educator
- Heinrich Theodor Menke (Germany, 1819–1892)
- August Heinrich Petermann (18 April 1822 – 25 September 1878), German cartographer
- George Philip (1800–1882), cartographer, map publisher and founder of the publishing house George Philip & Son Ltd.
- Erwin Raisz (1893–1968)
- Nain Singh Rawat (India, 1830–1882), cartographer and explorer
- Daniel Alfred Sanborn (United States, 1827–1883), founder of the prolific insurance map provider Sanborn Map Company
- William Schmollinger (fl. 1830s)
- Shanawdithit (Canada, c. 1801–1829), created maps depicting the movement Beothuk people in Newfoundland
- William R. Shepherd (1871–1934)
- Yuly Shokalsky (Russia, 1856–1940), also oceanographer and geographer
- Karl Spruner von Merz (Germany, 1803–1892)
- John Tallis (England, 1838–1851)
- Nicolas Auguste Tissot (France, 1824–1897), devised Tissot's indicatrix
- Edward A. Vincent (England/United States, c. 1825–27 November 1856), cartographer, civil engineer, architect
- Alexandre Vuillemin (France, 1812–1880)
- John Francon Williams FRGS (1854–4 September 1911), editor, journalist, writer, geographer, historian, cartographer and inventor
- Fanny Bullock Workman (United States, 1859–1925), geographer, cartographer, explorer, travel writer, and mountaineer
- James Wyld (England, 1812–1887)
- Hatsusaburō Yoshida (Japan, 1884–1955)

== 20th century ==
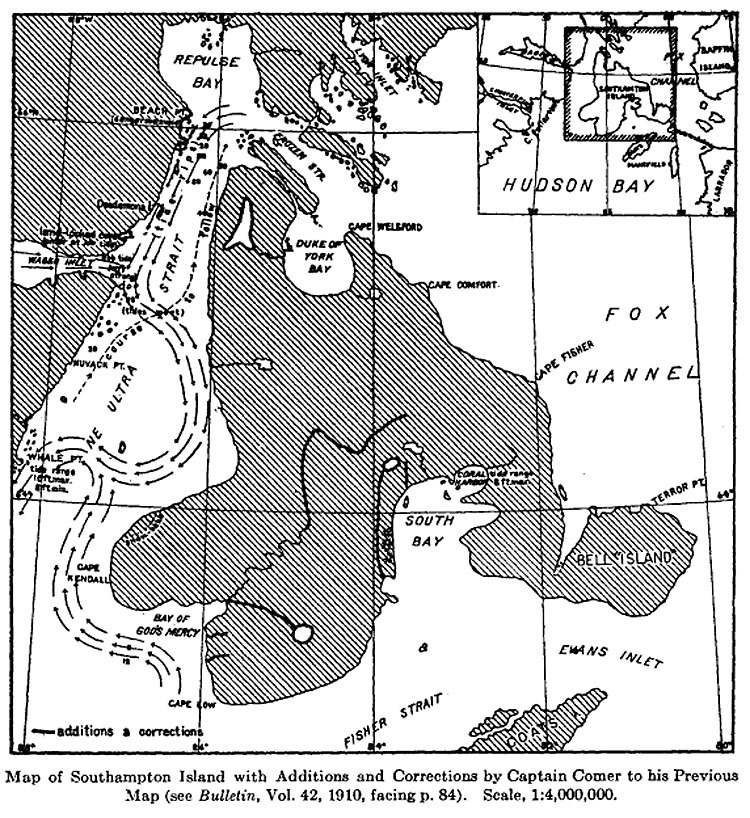
George Comer's 1913 map of Southampton Island

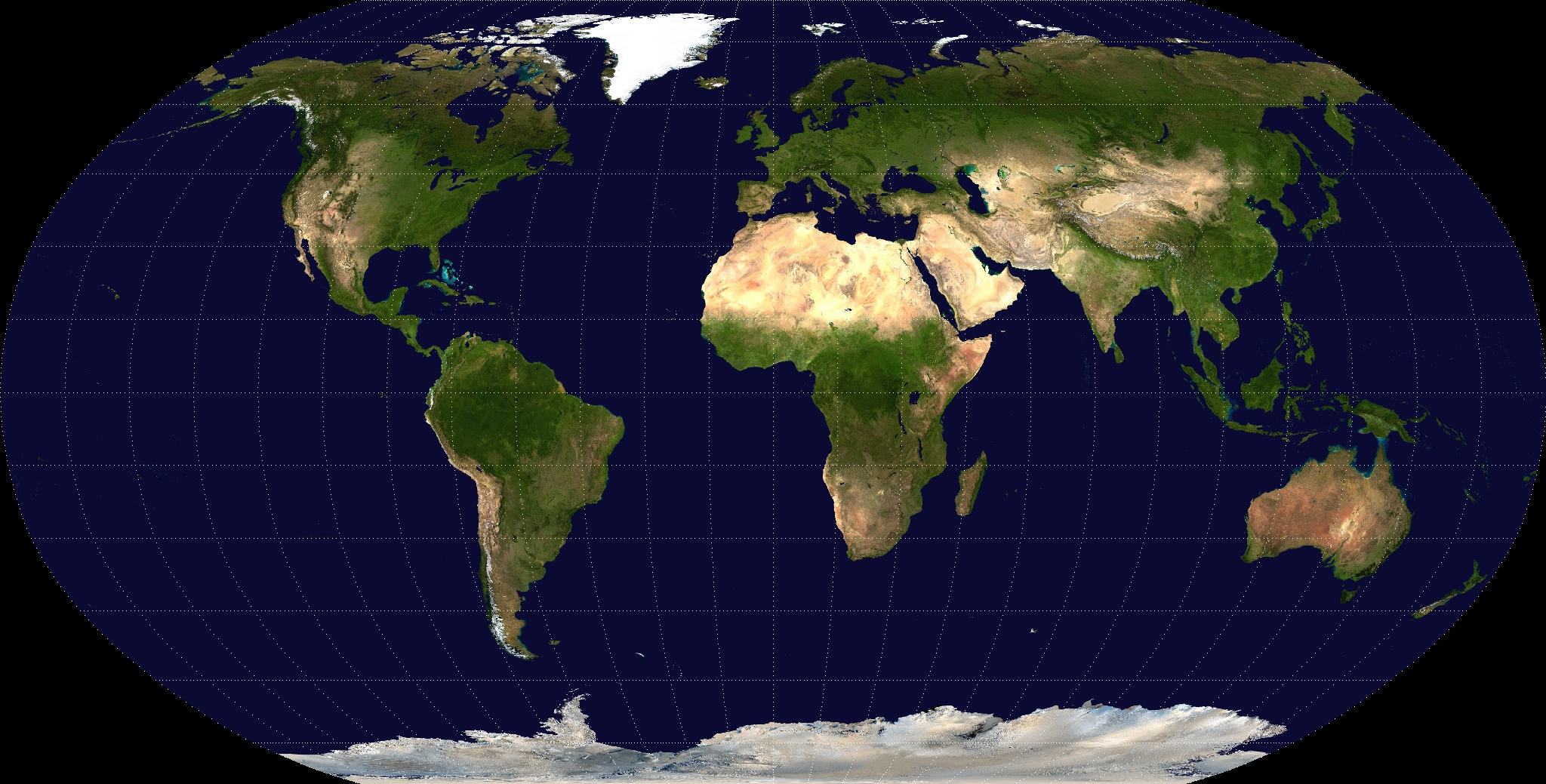
A Robinson projection of the Earth

- Jacques Bertin (France, 1918–2010)
- Josef Breu (Austria, 1914–1998)
- Cynthia Brewer (United States, 1957– ), developed ColorBrewer, professor at Penn State University
- Roger Brunet (1931– )
- Molly Burhans (United States, 1989 – )
- Eila Campbell (1915–1994), English geographer and cartographer
- Emanuela Casti (1950– ), formalized a semiotic theory of geographic maps
- Danny Dorling (1968– ), developed circular cartograms
- Marion A. Frieswyk (United States, 1922–2021), first female intelligence cartographer in the Central Intelligence Agency
- Ruth Rhoads Lepper Gardner (United States, 1905–2011), cartographer of the Maine coast
- Richard Edes Harrison (1901–1994)
- Tom Harrisson (1911–1976)
- George F. Jenks (1916–1996)
- Elrey Borge Jeppesen (1907–1996)
- Ingrid Kretschmer (1939–2011)
- Samuel Herbert Maw (1881–1952), architect, delineator and cartographer of Canada
- Kate McLean (United Kingdom), known for creating olfactory maps of cities
- Mark Monmonier (United States, 1943– ), wrote How to Lie with Maps; created the Monmonier Algorithm; Distinguished Professor Emeritus, Syracuse University
- Mark Newman (1968– ), developed area-contiguous cartograms using a diffusion-based method
- Rafael Palacios (1905–1993), prolific map-drawer for major US publishers
- Phyllis Pearsall (England, 1906–1996), creator of the Geographers' A–Z Street Atlas
- Jacques Pervititch (Turkey, 1877–1945), creator of series of insurance maps of Istanbul
- Edward Ayearst Reeves (1862–1945), British geographer, astronomer, and cartographer
- Arthur H. Robinson (1915–2004), wrote the influential textbook Elements of Cartography and developed the Robinson projection
- Abbas Sahab (1921–2000), Iranian cartographer, produced the first atlas of the Persian Gulf
- Paula Scher (United States, 1948– ), graphic designer, painter
- Nikolas Schiller (1980– ), Arabesque maps composed of kaleidoscopic aerial photographs
- Erwin Schneider (1906–1987), Austrian mountaineer and cartographer
- Kira B. Shingareva (Russia, 1938–2013), first person to successfully map the dark side of the moon
- Jessamine Shumate (1902–1990)
- John P. Snyder (1926–1997), developed the space oblique Mercator projection
- Dr. E. Lee Spence (1947– ), pioneer underwater archaeologist, decorative, historical maps showing shipwreck locations
- Marie Tharp (1920–2006), oceanographic cartographer, co-created the first scientific map of the ocean floor with Bruce Heezen
- Norman J. W. Thrower (1919–2002), professor at UCLA and author who was known for work in geography, surveying practices, and history
- Waldo R. Tobler (1930–2018), developed the first law of geography
- Bradford Washburn (1910–2007)
- Denis Wood (United States, 1945– ), artist, author, and former professor of design at North Carolina State University
- David Woodward (1942–2004)

== See also ==
- History of cartography
- List of geographers
- Ancient world maps
- Russian cartographers
- Category:Cartography organizations
- Category:Historians of cartography
