= Vuillemin =

Vuillemin is a surname. Notable people with the surname include:

- Alexandre Vuillemin (1812–1880), French cartographer
- David Vuillemin (born 1977), French motorcycle racer
- Jean Vuillemin, French computer scientist
- Jean-Claude Vuillemin (born 1954), French-born liberal-arts research professor at Penn State U.
- Jean Paul Vuillemin (1861–1932), French mycologist
- Joseph Vuillemin (1883–1963), French aviator and air force general
- Jules Vuillemin (1920–2001), French philosopher
- Louis Vuillemin (1870–1929), French composer
- Philippe Vuillemin (born 1958), French cartoonist

== See also ==
- Louis Vulliemin (1797–1879), Swiss theologian and historian
