= Fielding Lucas Jr. =

American cartographer, artist, and publisher

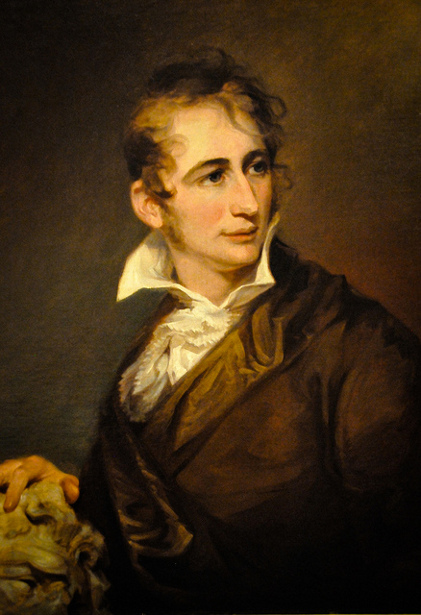
- Born: September 3, 1781; Fredericksburg
- Died: March 12, 1854 (aged 72); Baltimore
- Occupation: Cartographer, publisher

Fielding Lucas Jr. (September 3, 1781 – March 12, 1854) was an American cartographer, an artist, and a publisher of prominence during the early 19th century. He is known as the earliest successful commercial map publisher in the city of Baltimore. The first of his atlases was published in 1815–17, in which the maps are closely associated with the 1822 edition of Philadelphia atlas by Carey & Lea.

== Career history ==
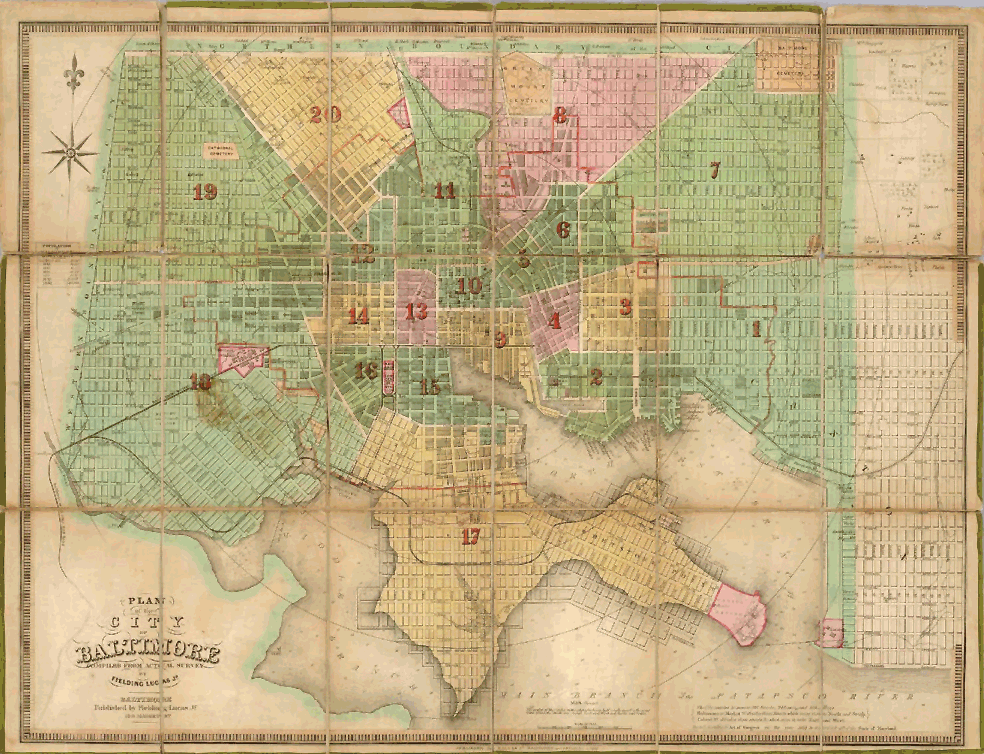
City plan of Baltimore by Fielding Lucas Jr., 1852

Lucas founded Lucas Bros. Inc. in 1804 at 116, East Baltimore Street, and became the first stationer in the United States. In 1806, he became the Baltimore manager of the Philadelphia publishing firm, Conrad, Lucas, and Co., when it opened its offices there.

In 1834, Lucas published the first edition of The Metropolitan Catholic Calendar and Laity's Directory - an annual calendar, which was renamed Metropolitan Catholic Almanac by him in 1838. In the 1845 issue, he inserted a map of the United States, "prepared at much expense to exhibit at a glance the extent and relative situation of the different dioceses", with a table of comparative statistics from 1835 to 1845. A list of the clergy in England and Ireland was added in the volume for 1850. Because of Lucas and a younger contemporary, the Ireland-born John Murphy, Baltimore was the major center of Catholic publishing until it moved to New York City at the beginning of the twentieth century.

In 1866, his son, William F. Lucas, acquired the Lucas Bros. printing and stationery business.

=== Books and atlases ===
Below are some of the books published by Lucas:

- A New and Elegant General Atlas: Containing Maps of Each of the United States (1814)
- A General Atlas Containing Distinct Maps of All the Known Countries in the World (1823)
- Lucas' Progressive Drawing Book (3 parts) (1827)
  - Part I: The Principles of drawing in Pencil
  - Part II: Colouring and Shading in India Ink
  - Part III: A Treatise on Perspective
- Picture of Baltimore: containing a description of all objects of interest in the city; and embellished with views of the principal public buildings (1832)

== Commemorations ==
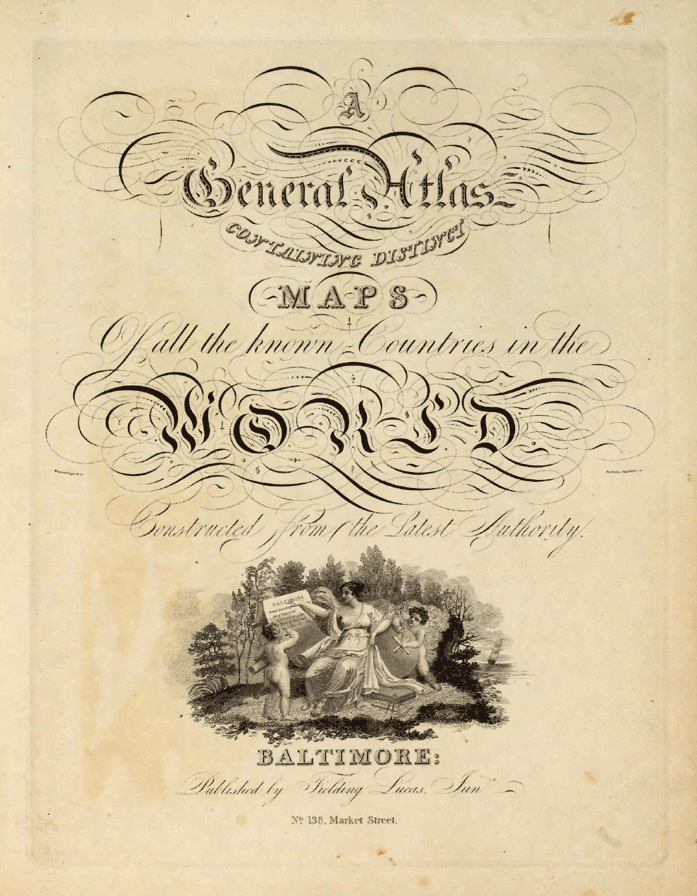
General Atlas of the world by Fielding Lucas Jr., 1823

As an artist, Lucas helped to publish one of the first color plate books titled Flora's Dictionary, for which an 1837 review reads, "One of the most popular genres of color plate books in the antebellum period were those devoted to the sentiments associated with flowers. Colored illustrations of flowers were accompanied by a text which guided the reader through the hidden meanings of different blooms, with quotations and poetry appropriate to each. This is a pioneering example of this type, issued by the publishers of many early books with color, Fielding Lucas of Baltimore. Similar works were issued at every level of quality and size, from pocket-sized volumes with crude plates to highly finished folios."

David Rumsey states that, "While the same base maps were used ... the maps in [this] Lucas Atlas are far superior in quality – Welch re-engraved many of the maps for Lucas that Young & Delker has engraved for Carey & Lea."

Rumsey further notes that the Lucas General Atlas of 1823 was the "finest general atlas produced in the U.S. at the time", setting aside the Tanner and Finley atlases as specialized publications.

== See also ==
- Ancient world maps
- List of cartographers
