= David de Meyne =

Dutch cartographer, painter and publisher

Georg Marcgrave
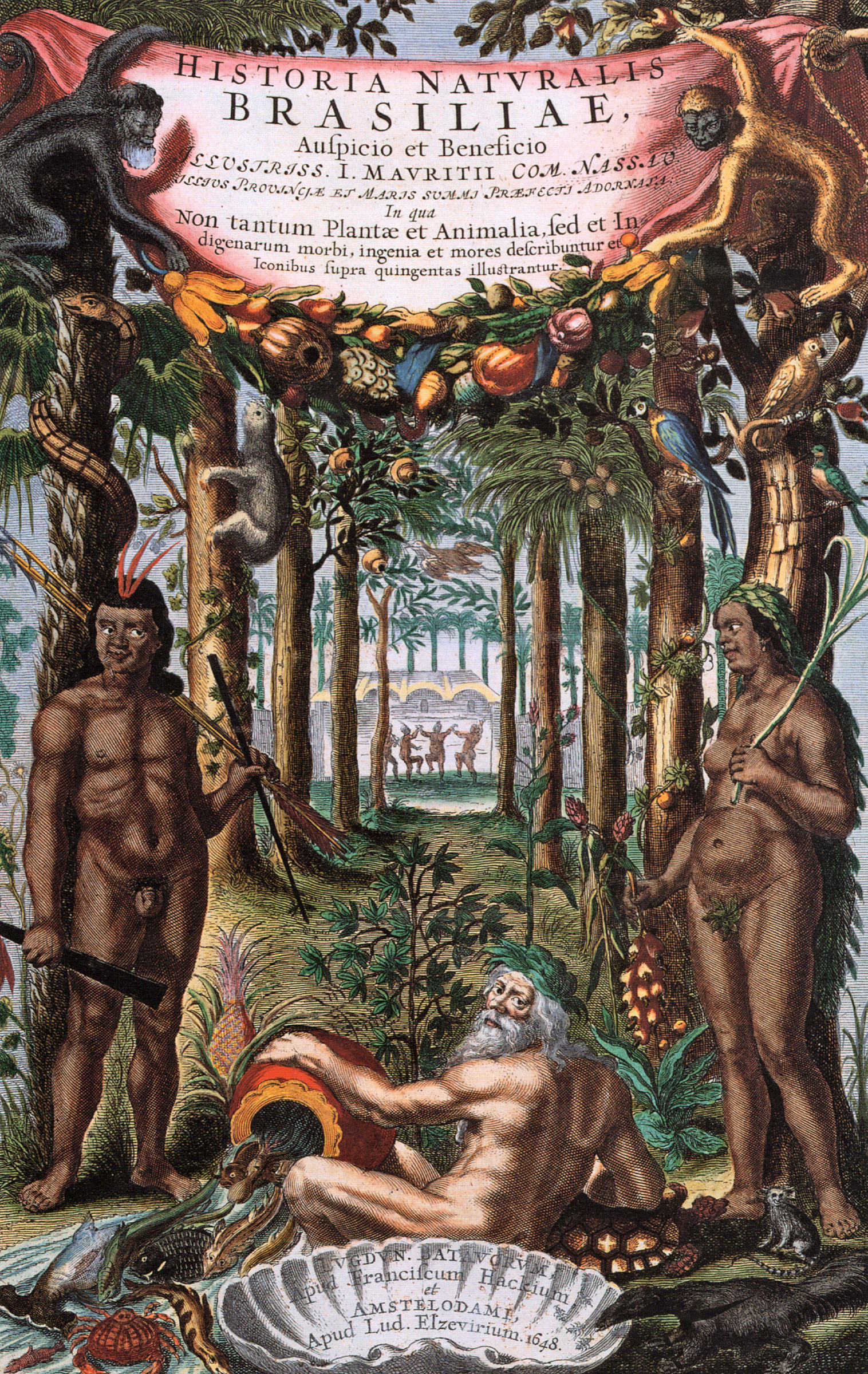
- Title page of Historia Naturalis Brasiliae (1648), based on Marcgrave's observations
- Born: 1610; Liebstadt, Electorate of Saxony
- Died: 1644; Luanda, Angola
- Occupations: Naturalist; astronomer; cartographer
- Known for: Scientific observations and maps of Dutch Brazil; contributions to Historia Naturalis Brasiliae (1648)

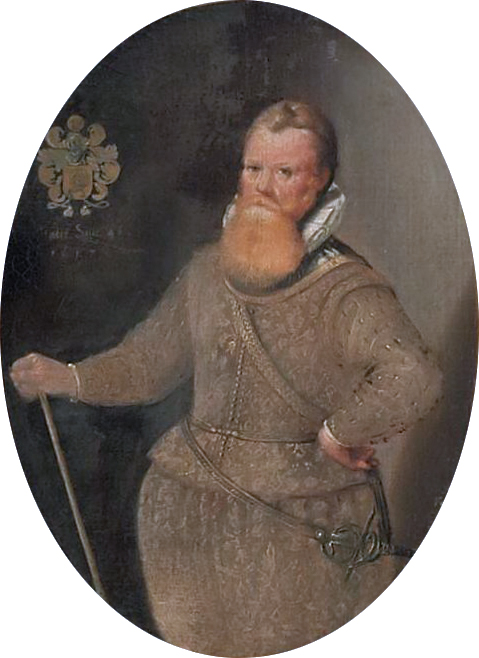
Painting of Frederik de Houtman from De Meyne's 1617 map of Ambon

David de Meyne (c. 1569 – 1620) was a Dutch cartographer, painter, publisher and art dealer. His early cartographic works combined maps, views and portraits.

== Early life and family ==
His family name is sometimes spelled de Moyne / Meijnersen. He was born in Maastricht, in the region of Limburg around 1569. He later moved to Amsterdam, where he is attested as active from 1594 to 1620, and was reported as living on Nieuw Rockin in 1594. He became a citizen of Amsterdam on 6 August 1596.

On 12 November 1594 he married Janneken Laurens (1577 – 1618) in Amsterdam. On 6 June 1611, one of his children was buried at Nieuwe kerk. After her death, in 1618, he became engaged to Soetje Cornelis, whom he married on 18 August 1618 in Amsterdam.

== Career ==
David de Meyne produced cartographic works that combined maps, portraits and narrative imagery, a format used in early seventeenth-century Dutch visual culture to present geography alongside the history of exploration.

=== Maps ===
In 1610 he completed Universi Orbis Tabula De-Integro Delineata, a large world map with inset portraits of the circumnavigators Olivier van Noort, Ferdinand Magellan, Francis Drake, and Thomas Cavendish. The map combines a geographic representation of the world with portraits commemorating early modern voyages of circumnavigation.

The design reflects a format used in early seventeenth-century Dutch cartography in which maps were combined with portraits and other imagery. In De Meyne's map the portraits identify explorers whose voyages had circumnavigated the globe.

The map shows the continents surrounded by the oceans and includes numerous place names known to European navigators in the early seventeenth century. Decorative elements are incorporated alongside the geographic information, a common feature of printed maps of the period.

=== Painting ===
The painting View of Ambon (Dutch: Gezicht op Ambon), dating from 1617, has been traditionally attributed to De Meyne. It formed part of a larger visual representation of Ambon that combined topographical description with portraits and narrative elements connected to Dutch East India Company (VOC) activity in the region. The work was commissioned by the Heeren XVII, the board of directors of the Dutch East India Company, and hung in the East India House in Amsterdam. Such images also helped present the company's authority and commercial presence in Southeast Asia. The painting is a homage to Frederik de Houtman, the first governor of the island, and summarizes the island's topography and the interests of the VOC there, particularly the clove trade. Harbors and cities in VOC maps and views such as this, representing the infrastructure that supported Dutch trade, were often depicted as disproportionately large.

== Gallery ==
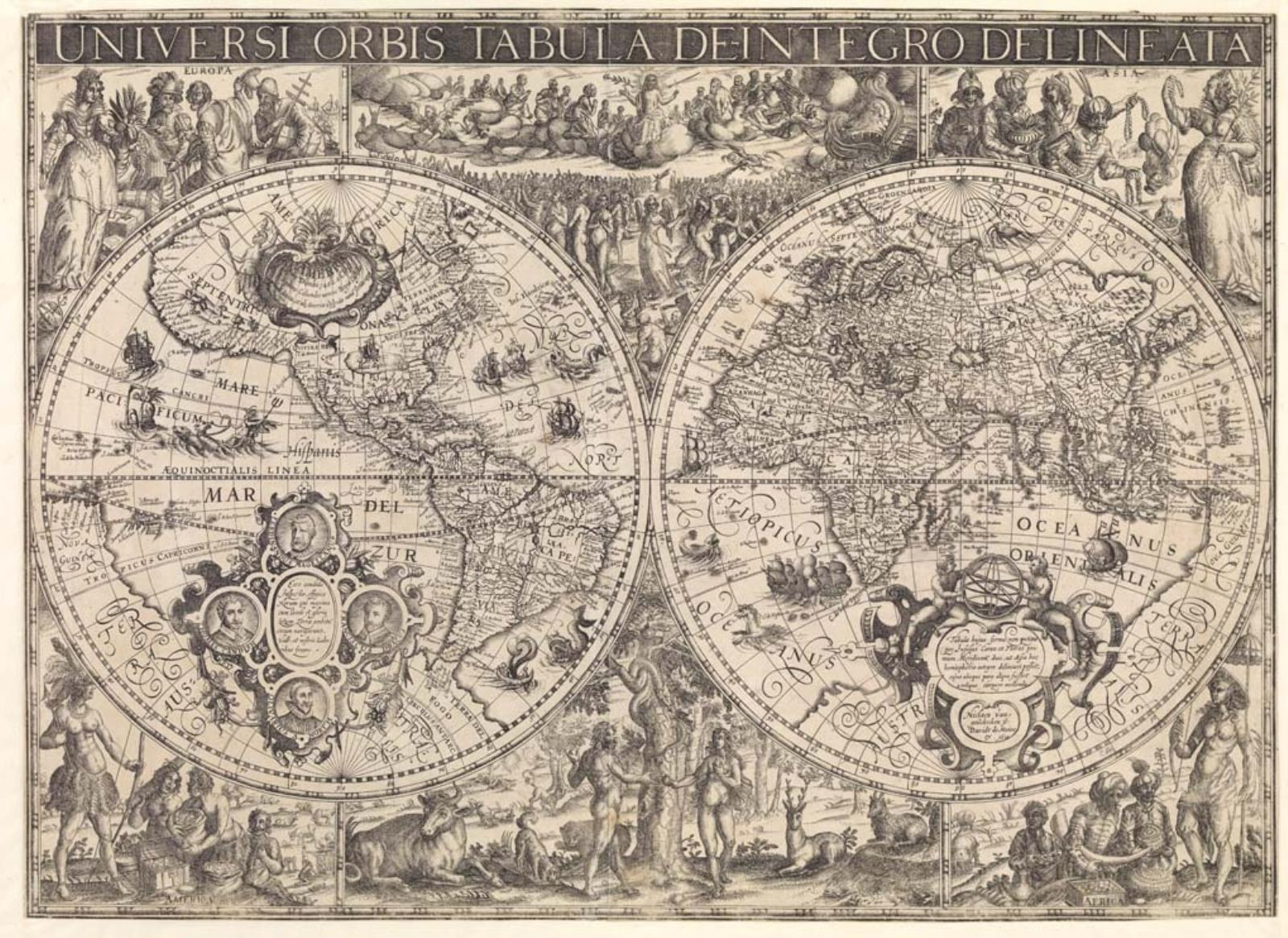
Universi Orbis Tabula De-Integro Delineata, 1610, Maritime Museum, Rotterdam

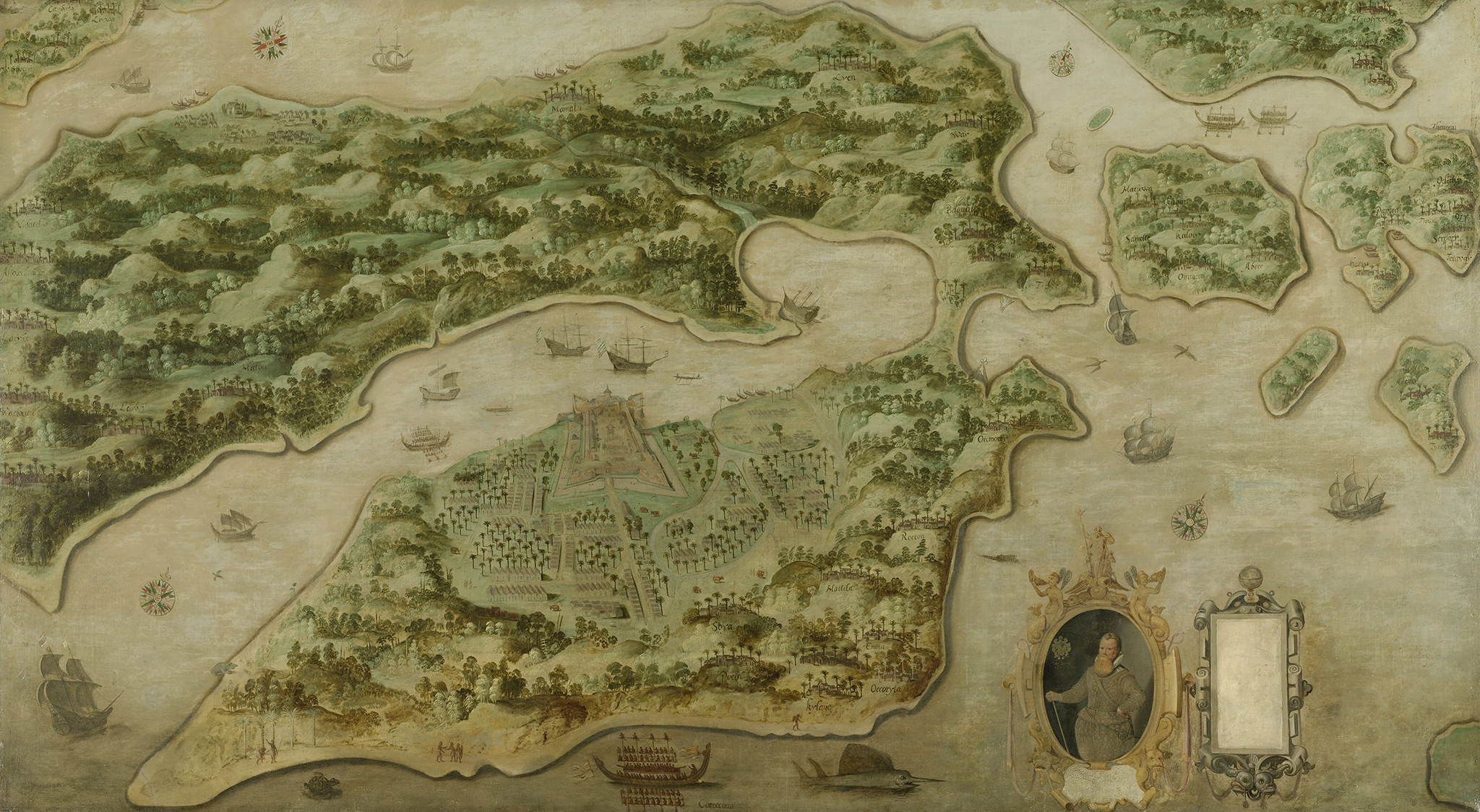
View of Ambon, c. 1617, Rijksmuseum, Amsterdam
