= Eugenia Wheeler Goff =

American historian and author (1844–1922)

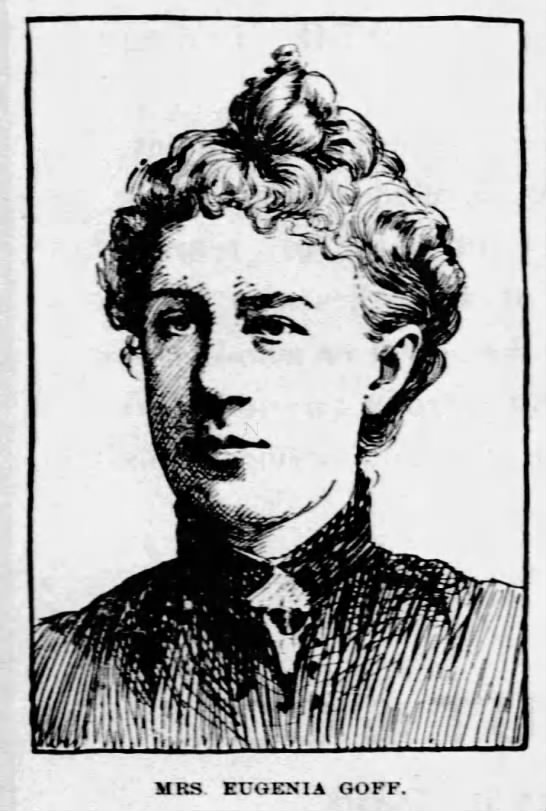
- Eugenia Almira Wheeler Goff, from "Woman's World" newspaper column
- Born: January 17, 1844; Monroe County, New York
- Died: May 12, 1922 (aged 78); Minneapolis
- Occupations: Author, cartographer, educator
- Spouse: Henry Slade Goff

Eugenia Wheeler Goff (1844–1922) was an American historian, cartographer, educator, and author. She was also a co-founder of the National Historical Publishing Company, which is known for publishing historical maps.

== Biography ==
Eugenia was born January 17, 1844, in North Clarkson, Monroe County, New York to Joseph Lacy Wheeler and Sarah Ann Peck. In 1859, her parents decided to move to Winona, Minnesota. Ten years later, she graduated at the state's Normal school.

Her school employed Eugenia after graduation and she worked there for eight years. When she left, she had a rank of first assistant. Eugenia then held teaching positions in a teachers' training school and in various state institutes. She was also a state inspector of training schools for teachers in Minnesota. An account cited that she worked for two years under the State Superintendent of Schools, teaching patriotism and good citizenship to teachers and students. In 1894, she ran for the Minneapolis school board. Although she lost, Eugenia was endorsed by the Prohibitionist, Populist, and Democratic parties.

Eugenia was married to Henry Slade Goff in 1882. The couple founded the National Historical Publishing Company, which published her historical maps. Eugenia died on May 12, 1922.

== Works ==
In 1876, Eugenia wrote Minnesota, Its Geography, History, and Resources. The book was later adopted in all common and graded schools in her state. The text was considered groundbreaking for combining history, resources, and geography, an idea later used by other textbook publishers in the United States.

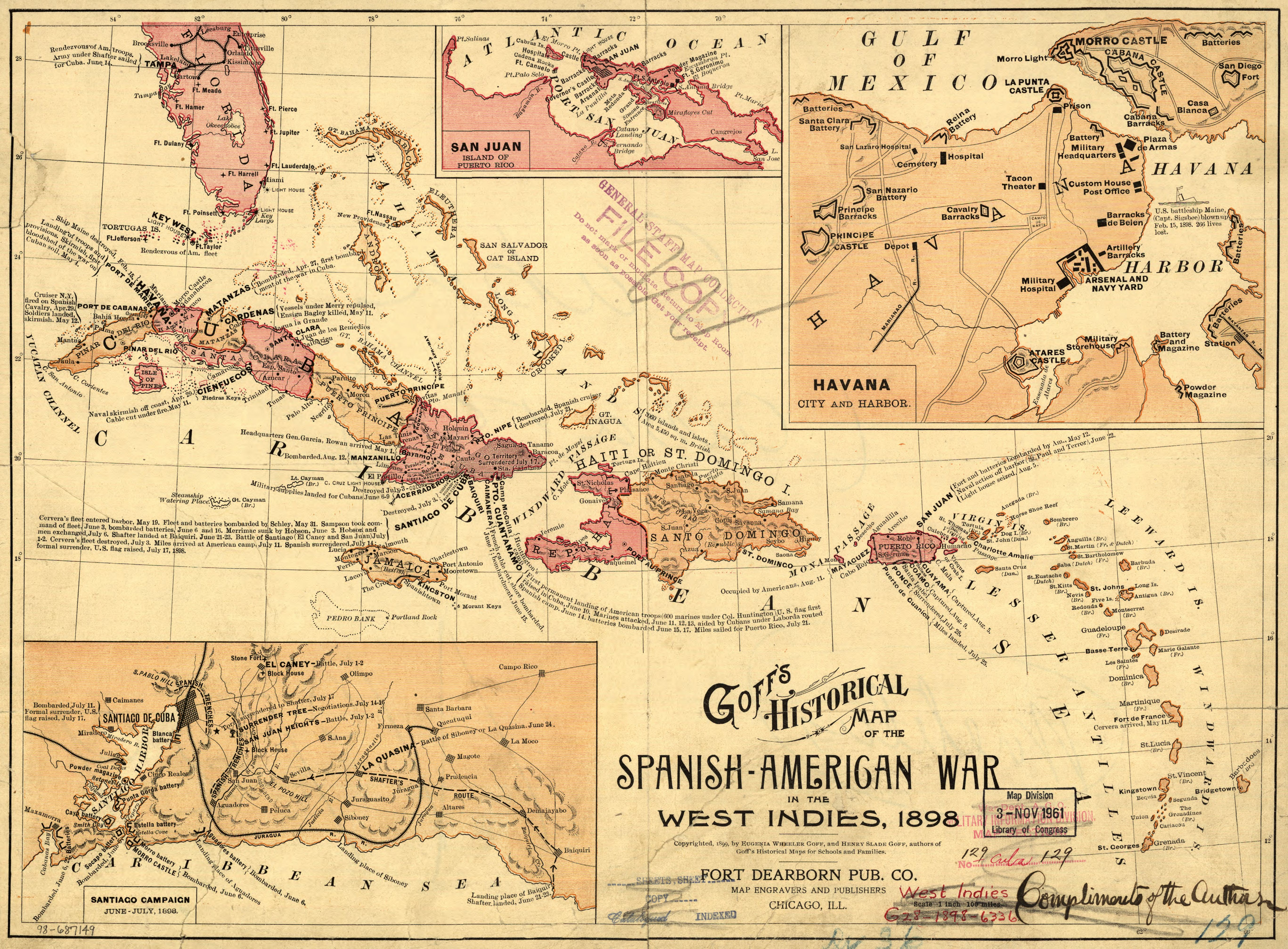
Goff's historical map of the Spanish-American War in the West Indies, 1898

Prior to her marriage, she was already the creator of historical wall maps that included historical events of countries. Together with her husband, Eugenia completed the Goff's Historical Map of the Spanish-American War in the West Indies, 1898. It was published in 1899 shortly after the signing of the 1898 Treaty of Paris, which concluded the Spanish-American War. This work recorded the battles that transpired during the war in the West Indies and included the military and naval maneuvers in Cuba and Puerto Rico.

Eugenia's collaboration with her husband produced over 100 historical maps, charts, and books, which included the historical atlas called The United States and Her Neighbors and the Goff's Historical Map of the Philippine Islands.
