= Ingrid Kretschmer =

Austrian cartographer, geographer and university teacher (1939–2011)

- Born: 22 February 1939; Austria
- Died: 22 January 2011 (aged 71)
- Occupations: Cartographer, Geographer, Professor
- Employer: University of Vienna
- Notable work: Lexikon zur Geschichte der Kartographie

Ingrid Kretschmer (22 February 1939 – 22 January 2011) was an Austrian cartographer and geographer who published multiple works in the areas of cartographic study. She served as the secretary general of the Austrian Geographical Society, one of the oldest geographic societies in the world, later serving as the first female president of the organization in 2004.

== Personal life ==
Born on February 22, 1939, Ingrid's father was an engineer in Linz, Austria and her mother died in childbirth when Ingrid was at the age of 6. She was frequently charged taking care of her two younger siblings.

In 1957, she began to study geography and European ethnology at the University of Vienna. During this time, she had atlases published in the Österreichischer Volkskunde-Atlas (Ethnological Atlas of Austria) and eventually became the director of the publication. She served as assistant to Erik Arnberger who was serving as a professor of cartography at the University of Vienna.

She presented her thesis in 1974 and was assigned as a full professor of cartography in 1988.

== Published works ==
- Lexikon zur Geschichte der Kartographie (1986)
- Volume 3 of Atlantes Austriaci: Österreichische Atlanten 1561–1994 (1995)
- Österreichische Kartographie: Von den Anfängen im 15. Jahrhundert bis zum 21. Jahrhundert (2004) was a textbook on Austrian cartography co-authored with Franz Wawrik and Johannes Dörflinger

== Published in Imago Mundi ==
Ingrid frequently published articles in Imago Mundi. Mostly in 1988 and 1991, but also an obituary for a colleague in 2004.

- The mapping of Austria in the twentieth century (1991)
- The First and Second Austrian School of Layered Relief Maps in the Nineteenth and Early Twentieth Centuries (1988)
- Wolfgang Scharfe (1942-2003) (2004)
