= Joan Martines =

16th Century cartographer from Messina

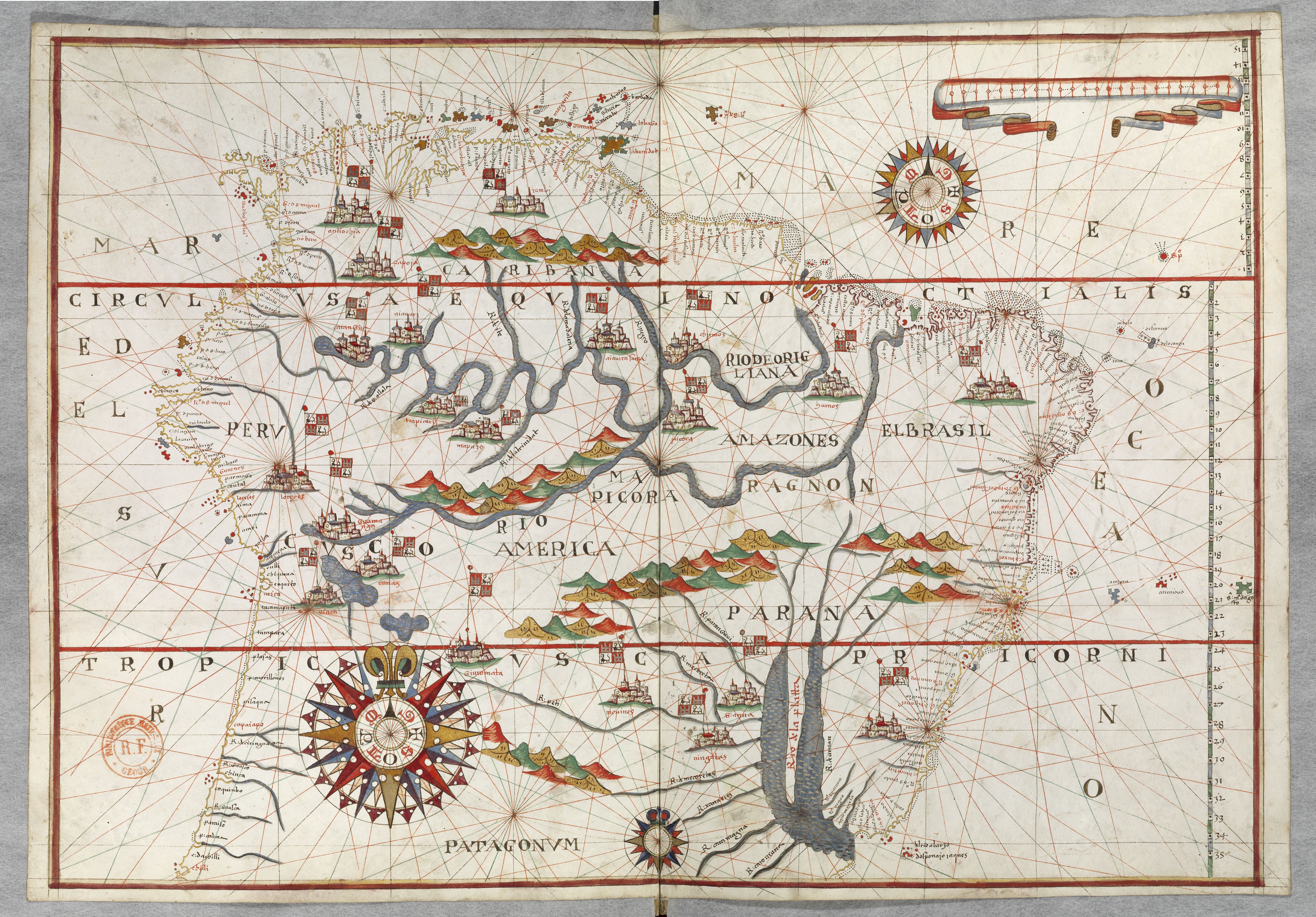
Chart of Northern South America by Joan Martines, 1583

Joan Martines (birth date unknown, died in Naples, 1591) was a cartographer and cosmographer who worked for most of his life in Messina. He is known as one of the most prolific cartographers of the sixteenth century.

== Biography ==
The date of birth of Joan Martines is unknown. In a number of his charts, he signed himself as "Joan Martines de Messina", and it is generally assumed that Messina was his birthplace. Historian of geography Corradino Astengo suggests he may have had Majorcan or Catalan roots, and notes that some scholars such as Guiseppe Caraci considered this probable.

The first known atlas by Martines is dated 1556. It was made in Messina where he worked until 1589. His work consists mainly of manuscript atlases. Astengo lists 20 atlases in public collections which are definitely attributed to Martines, and 13 which are probably by him. Additionally he lists 8 individual charts. Martines produced portolan charts of the Mediterranean basin, and his atlases cover all parts of the world and include world maps.

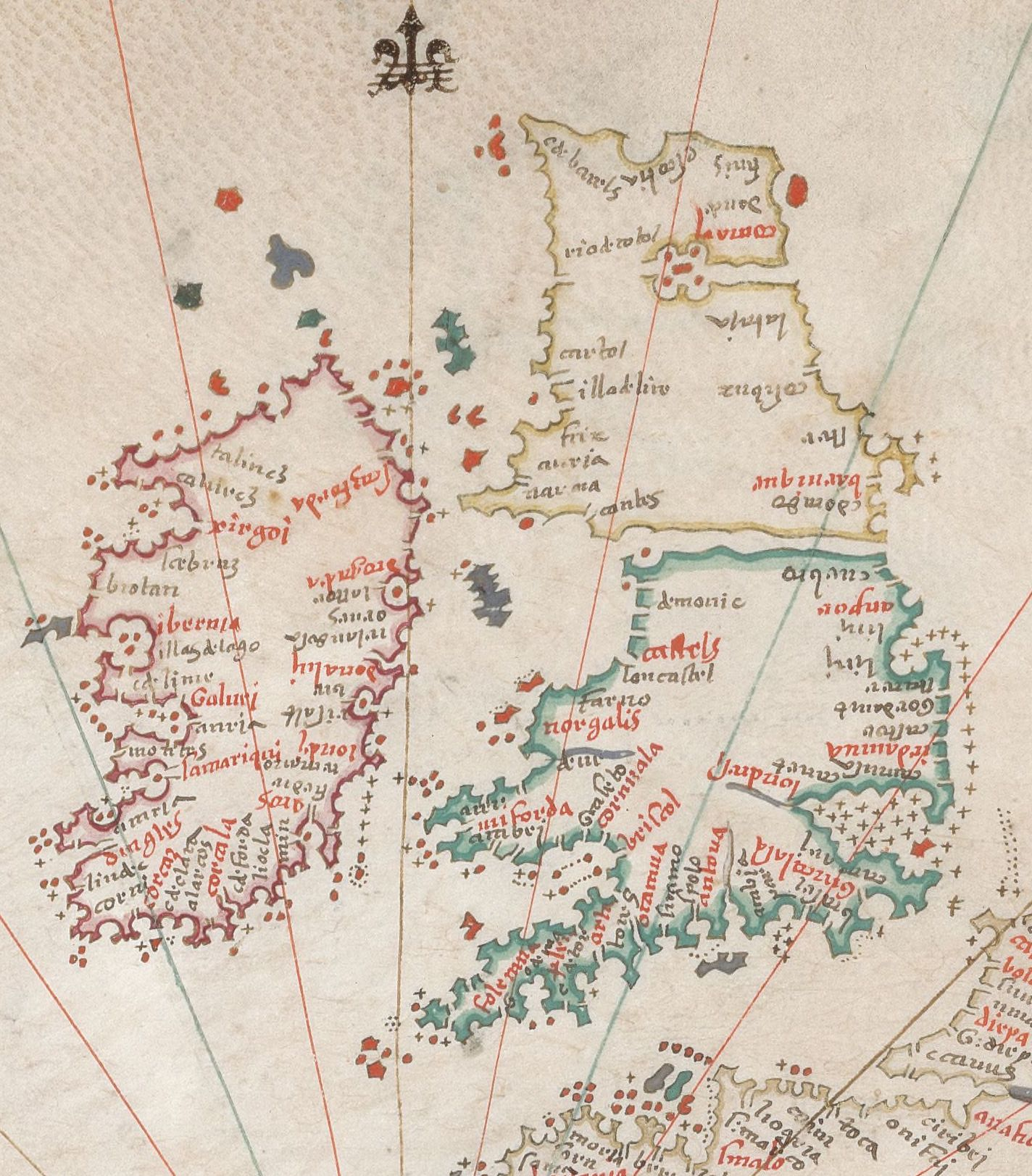
Detail from a Martines atlas of the 1580s showing England and Scotland as separate Islands

Martines's work is noted for careful execution and splendour of colour. His maps and charts may have been intended more for decorative than navigation purposes. They draw on the work of older cartographers such as Giacomo Gastaldi and show no advance on much older charts. For example his maps of the New World include one from 1578 which still shows the legendary and wealthy Seven cities of Cibola, which had been known for 40 years to be settlements of adobe huts with no treasure. Another example is the representation of Great Britain. A Martines chart from the 1580s shows England and Scotland as separate islands. As Michael Andrews has noted, maps showing a clear separation between Scotland and England first appeared in the 15th century, perhaps due to copyists' misunderstanding of earlier maps. Martines's maps were the last that Andrews found with this feature.

In 1589 or 1590, Martines moved to Naples, becoming official cosmographer to the Kingdom of Naples replacing Domenico Vigliarolo. He probably died in 1591, the year he made his last known work, and there is no record of him being replaced as royal cosmographer.

== Gallery ==
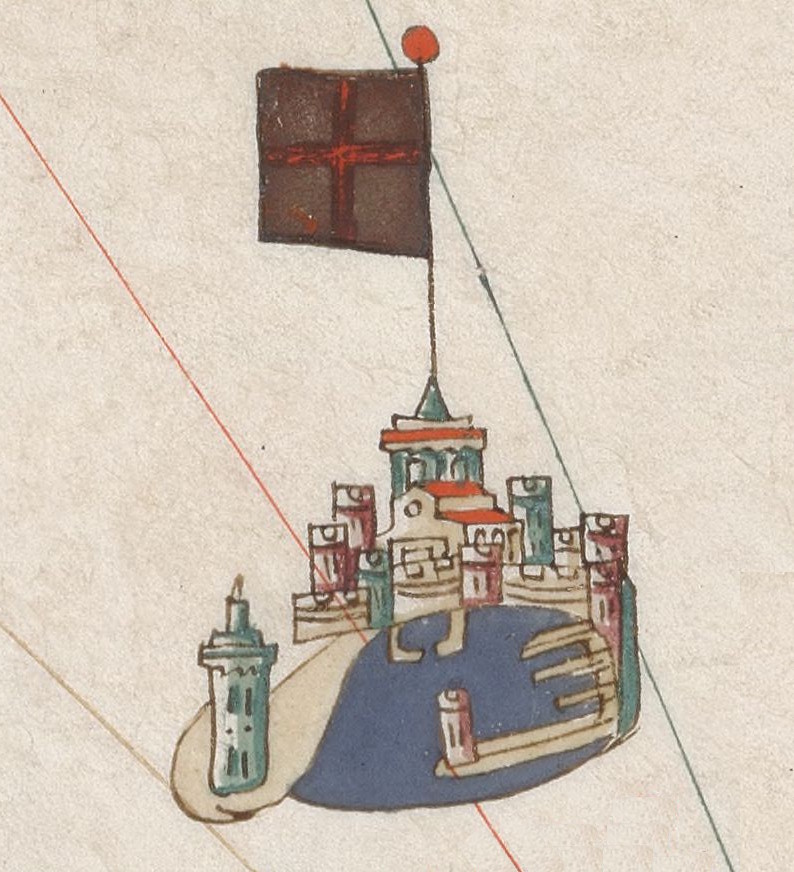
Vignette of Genoa from a 1580s chart of the Mediterranean with the harbour and lighthouse.

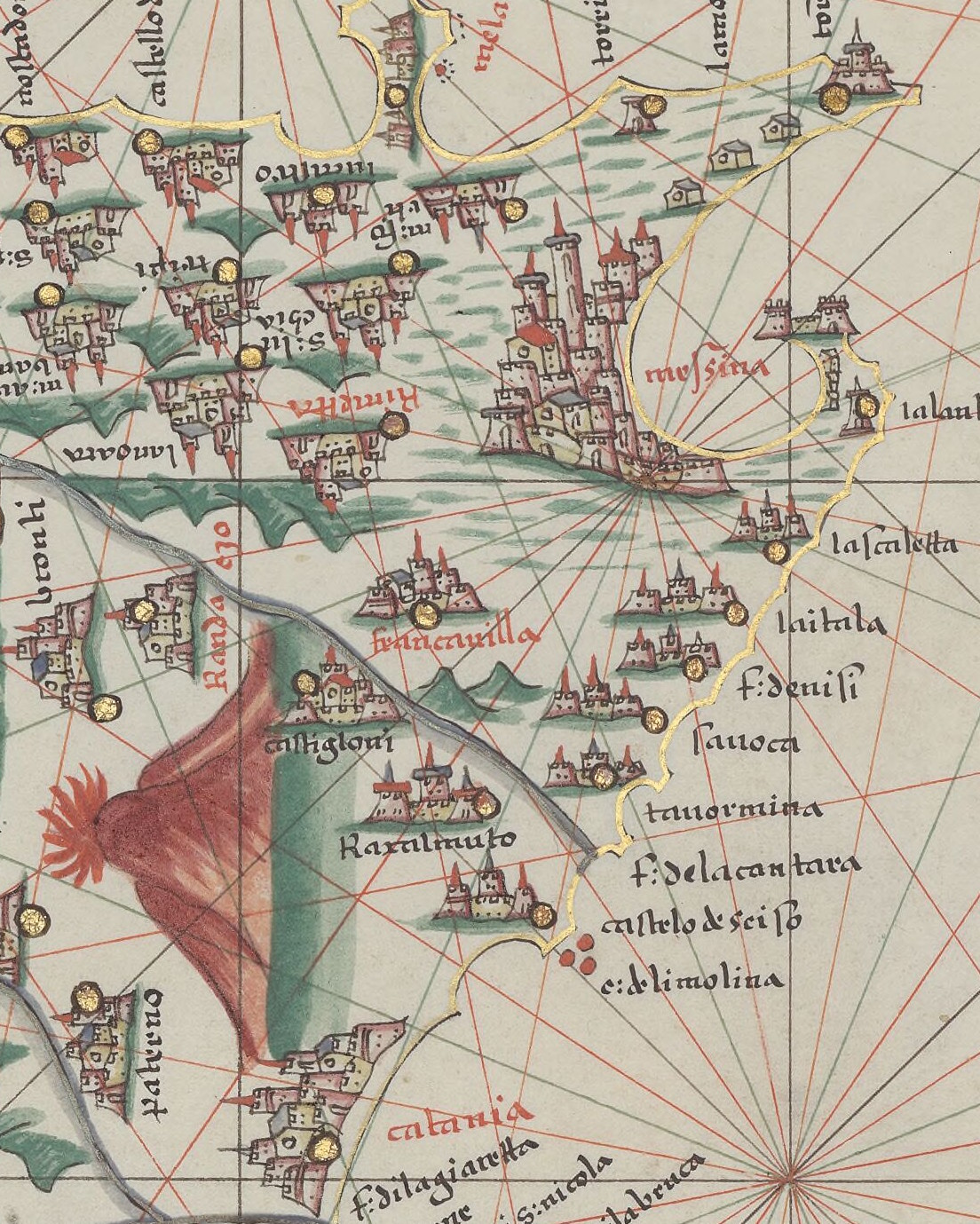
Messina and Mount Etna from a chart in Martines's 1582 atlas

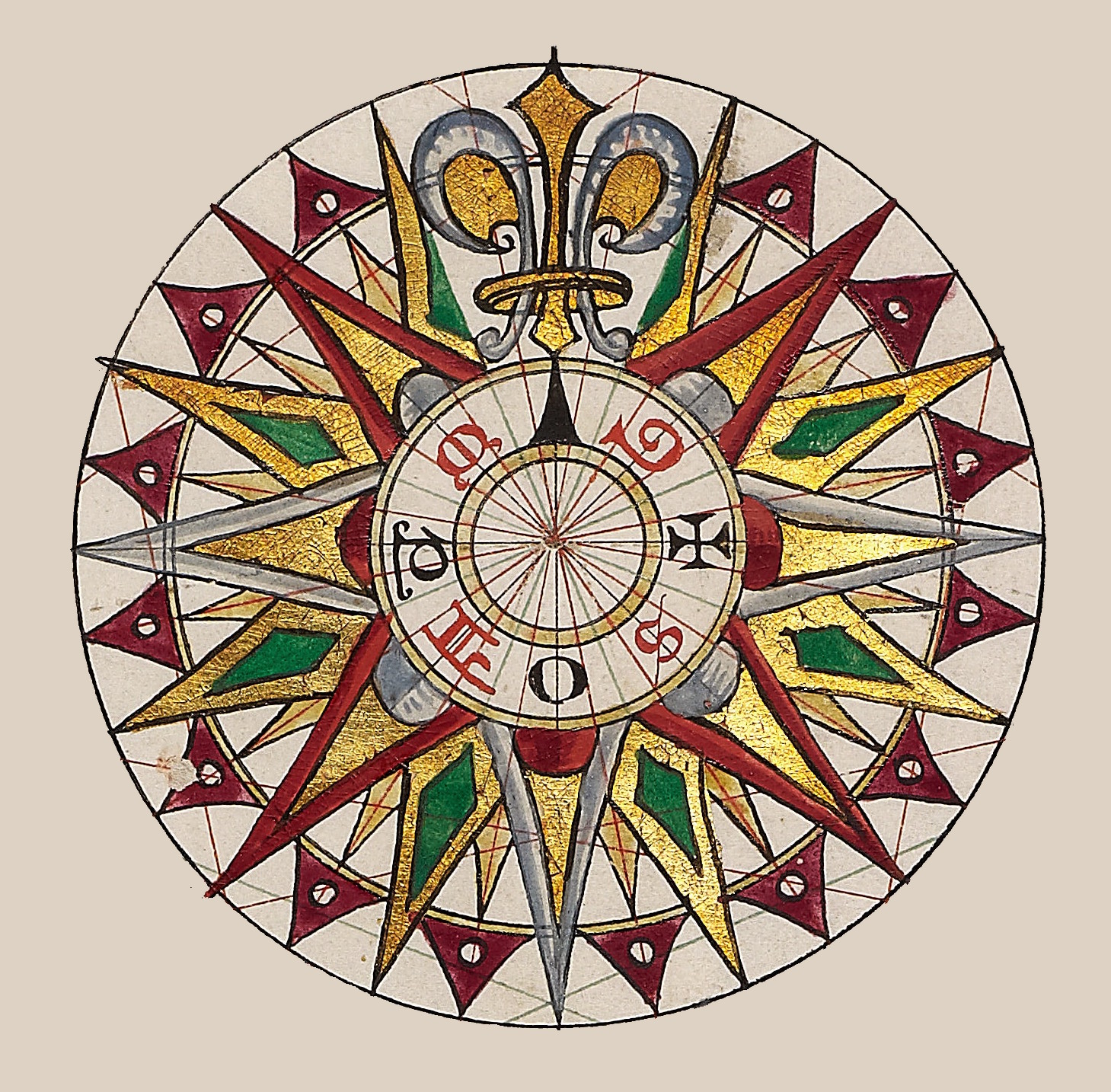
Compass rose from a chart in Martines's 1591 atlas, his last known work
