= Jan Van Hanswijk =

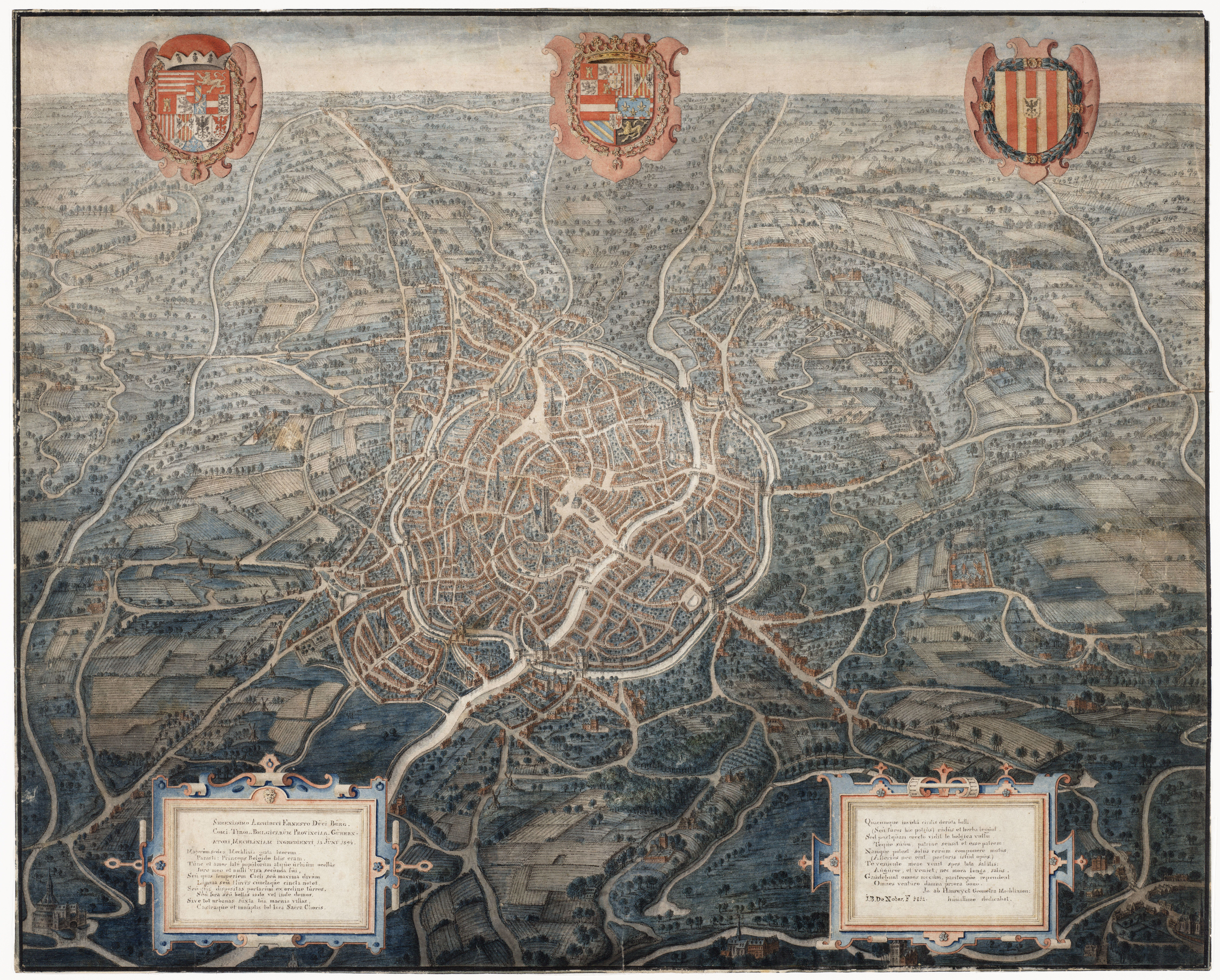
Copy of the map of Mechelen by Van Hanswijk

Jan Van Hanswijk (fl. late 16th century) was a Flemish surveyor and cartographer, best known for making a map of the city of Mechelen, completed in the last quarter of the 16th century. His map is the second oldest preserved city map of Mechelen. Differently from Jacob van Deventer, who had made an earlier map, he depicted all important city buildings in his own map. After two centuries the map was in such a bad state that the Count of Coloma commissioned a copy from Jan Baptist De Noter.
