= Osgood Carleton =

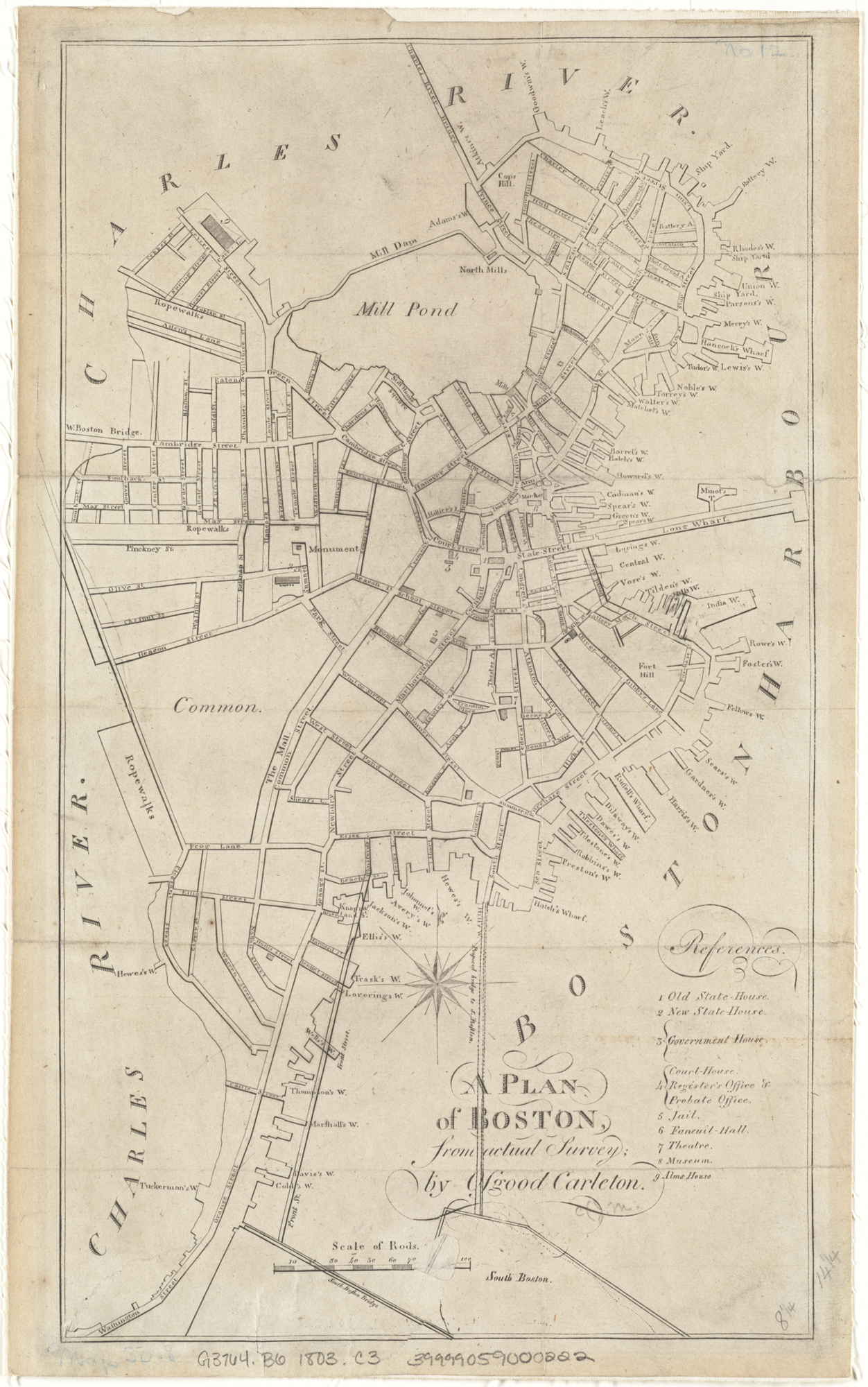
A Plan of Boston (Created by Osgood Carleton and Published by John West in 1803)

Osgood Carleton (1741–1816) was a cartographer, land surveyor, mathematics and navigation teacher, and author in Boston, Massachusetts.

== Life and work ==
By the close of the American Revolution there rose a need for practical knowledge in the applied sciences, outside of the public schools which taught only reading, writing, Latin and basic math. In June 1787, Carleton launched his career in lecturing, and by 1 August 1787, the Boston Board of Selectmen approved his application to open a school, teaching surveying, gauging, mensuration, algebra, geometry, geography, astronomy, dialing, navigation, gunnery, and architecture. An advertisement for his school can be found in the Peter Short 1791 ciphering book found in the Phillips Library at the Peabody Essex Museum (PEM). A surviving example of one of his teaching texts can be found at the Boston Athenaeum, Compendium of Practical Arithmetic.

He then went on to become a key cartographer in the early mapping of Maine. Carleton persuaded the Commonwealth to require that every town should make a detailed plan and he used these to create maps for Massachusetts and Maine. His maps in 1801 and 1802 offer information about economic activities in early Maine.
