= Joost Janszoon Bilhamer =

Dutch cartographer (1521–1590)

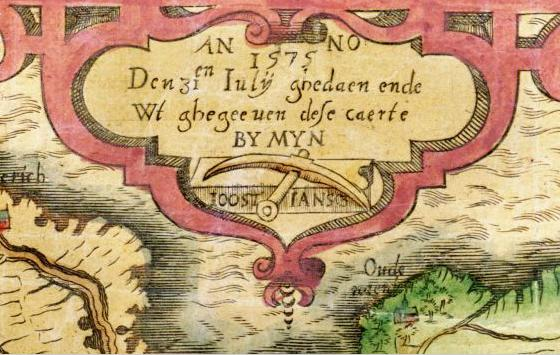
Signature of a pickhamer above Joost Jansz

Joost Janszoon Bilhamer (1521 – 8 November 1590) was a Dutch sculptor, engraver, and cartographer.

== Biography ==
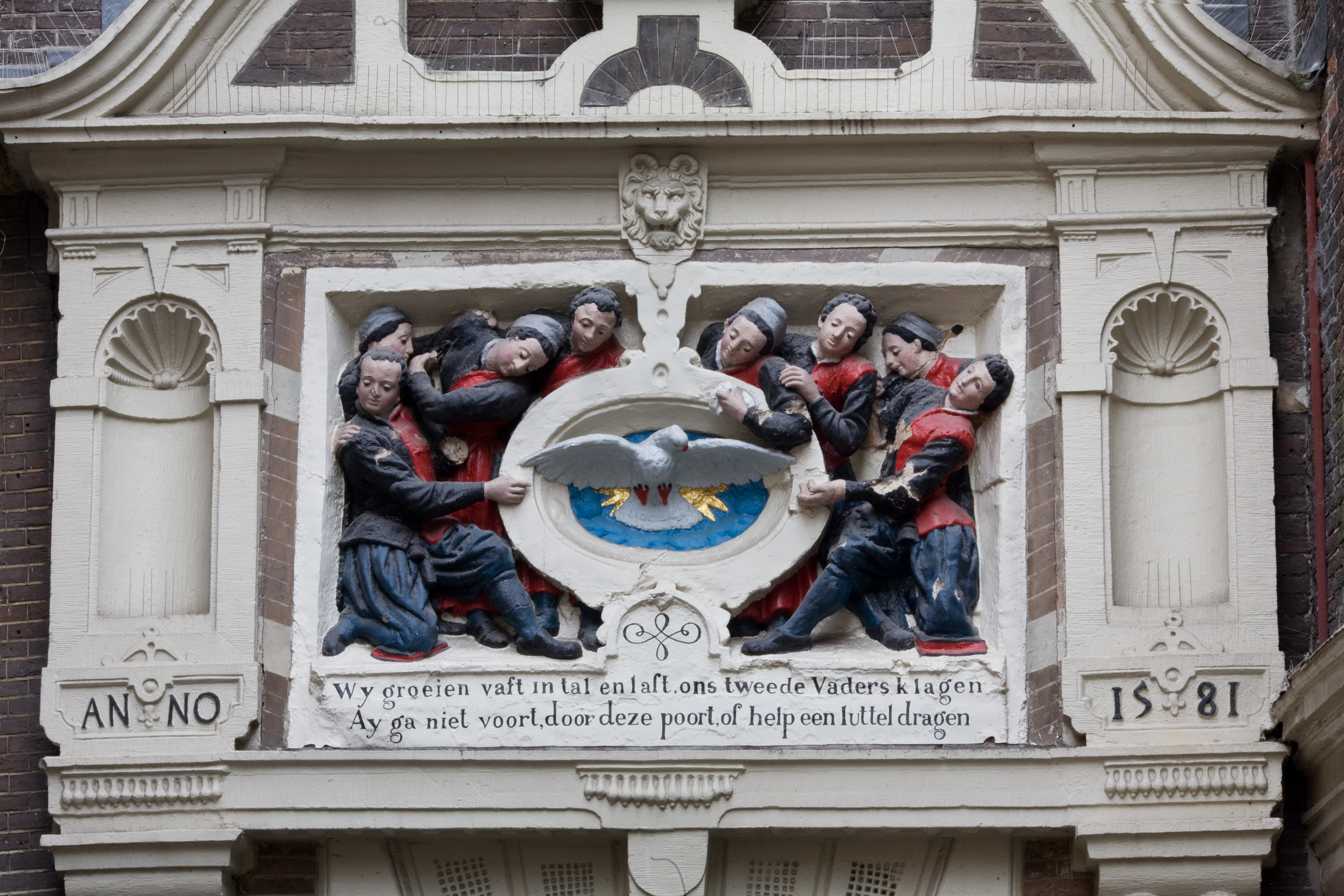
Sculpted relief of the orphans above the doorway to the Amsterdam orphanage, today the Amsterdam Museum

He was born in Amsterdam in 1521 according to the RKD and in 1541 according to Jan Wagenaar's History of Amsterdam. He made a map of Leiden in 1573 and a map of North Holland in 1575. He was known for sculpted groups in religious buildings in Amsterdam, that were lost during the iconoclasm known as the beeldenstorm. He lived in the Kalverstraat in the house known as "'t Ossehooft". His sculpted relief for the Amsterdam orphanage survives. He died in Amsterdam on 8 November 1590.
