= Marion A. Frieswyk =

US intelligence cartographer (1921–2021)

- Born: September 17, 1921; New York, USA
- Died: August 26, 2021 (aged 99)
- Other name: Marion Annette Armstrong
- Occupations: Office of Strategic Services (OSS), CIA
- Known for: First woman employed in the Map Division’s Cartography Section of the CIA
- Spouse: Henry Frieswyk

Marion A. Frieswyk (1921 - 2021) was the first female intelligence cartographer for the Map Division's Cartography Section of the CIA and former member of the Office of Strategic Services. She played a key role in creating cartographic resources for strategic military operations during World War 2. Her work helped to advance mapping as a field and the quality of map production and creation.

== Biography ==
Frieskwyk (maiden name unknown) grew up in upstate New York. Her family owned a pea farm, which they lost during the Great Depression. Her mother worked as a cook. Instead of going to a finishing school, she completed a degree in 1942 at Potsdam State Teachers College with the goal of becoming an elementary teacher. When the United States began mobilizing during World War II, she applied to a summer graduate school course at Clark University, which trained civilian geographers for war-service jobs.

== Career ==
Frieswyk was offered a job in the Office of Strategic Services (OSS) by Arthur H. Robinson, who was a well-known geographer of the time. When she was recruited, Frieswyk was 21 years old and still a graduate student at Clarks University. Her primary role was to organize intelligence information collected by field agents and produce both 2D and 3D topographic maps. She created maps that were used in the planning for the invasion of Italy, and throughout World War 2 for strategic decision making by the Joint Chiefs of Staff. She is credited for contributing in the development of a unique system of map production that improved map quality and production efficiency.

After the OSS was discontinued in 1945, the CIA was formed. Frieswyk stayed on and was employed as the first female in the Map Division's Cartography Section of the CIA. She worked for the CIA until 1958.

When the OSS was awarded the Congressional Gold Medal in 2016, Frieswyk was one of the 20 OSS veterans who attended in a ceremony in Washington D.C.

== Personal life ==
Marion Frieswyk was married to Henry Frieswyk. He was a co-worker and another graduate student from Clark University. After her retirement in the 1950s, her husband continued to work for the CIA and became the head of its cartography division. He retired in 1980.
