= Alexandre Vuillemin =

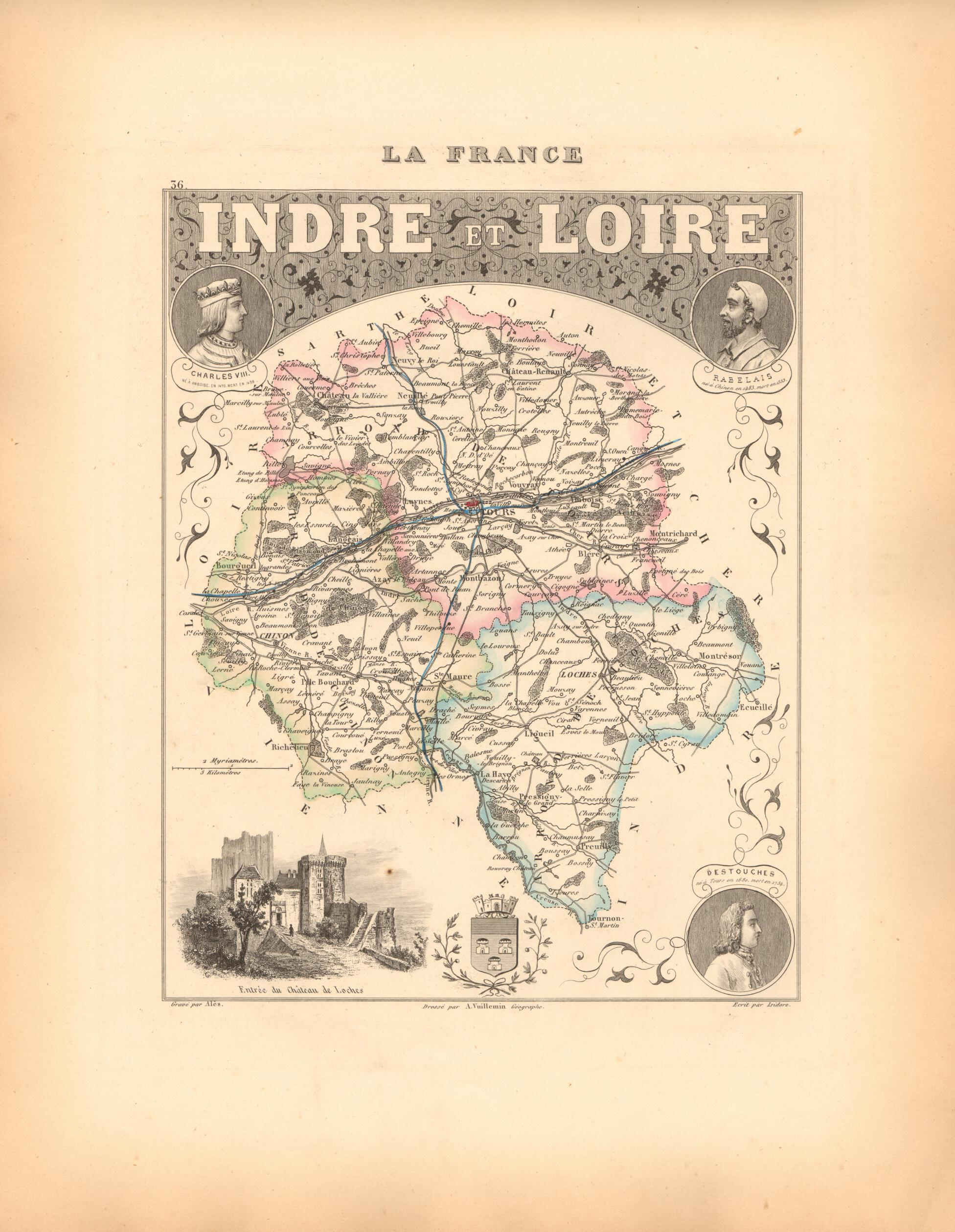
Map of Indre et Loire Department from Vuillemin's 1858 edition of La France et ses Colonies, showing his typically detailed and decorative margins.

Alexandre Vuillemin (1812–1880) was a 19th-century French cartographer and editor based in Paris. He produced a number of atlases, and his maps are noted for the frequent use of extensive margin illustrations – vignettes, famous people, and views of cities. His atlases were popular, and many went through multiple editions.

Despite a prolific cartographic career, not a lot is known of Vuillemin's life. He studied under the French cartographer Auguste Dufour (1798 - 1865), and his atlases and maps are held by and available through many collections including the British Museum and the University of Alabama Historical Maps of Europe Archive. Vuillemin's most important works include his detailed, highly decorative large format Atlas Illustré de Géographie Commerciale et Industrielle as well as his many French Atlases.

== Selected works ==
- Atlas illustré de géographie commerciale et industrielle
- Atlas illustré destiné à l'enseignement de la géographie élémentaire
- Atlas universel (1839, 1847 and 1871)
- Atlas de géographie ancienne et moderne à destination des pensionnats (Paris 1843)
- Atlas national illustré de la France (1845)
- Mappemonde (Paris 1856)
- Atlas du cosmos (1867)
- Atlas topographique de la France (1873)
- Atlas de géographie contemporaine (1875)
- Carte de la Baltique donnant le Sund, le golfe de Finlande (1854)
- La France et ses Colonies: Atlas illustré cent cartes dressées d’après les cartes de Cassini, du Dépot de la guerre, des Ponts-et-chaussées et de la Marine (1858 and 1870)

== External links to Works Available Online ==
- La France et ses Colonies, 1858. Link to 101 maps from the atlas “France and its Colonies” at Old Book Art
- University of Alabama University of Alabama Historical Maps of Europe Archive (1836-1850). Some of his maps of Europe.
