= Antonio Zatta =

Antonio Zatta (fl. 1750 – April 2, 1797) was an Italian cartographer and publisher who was based in Venice. He may have lived from about 1722 to 1804. By 1750 he was operating the business "Antonio Zatta e figli Librai e Stampatori veneti" with his sons with premises in Venice. One of his major contributions includes the Atlante Novissimo, a four volume atlas of the world. Also, his grand study of St Mark's Basilica in Venice, printed in 1761.

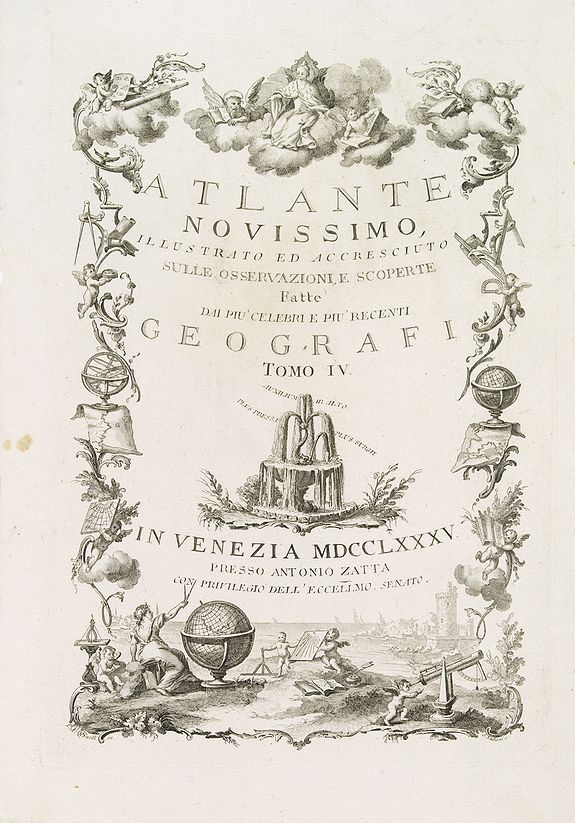
From Atlante Novissimo

He also published an edition of the plays of Goldoni with engravings in 1789.

== Gallery ==
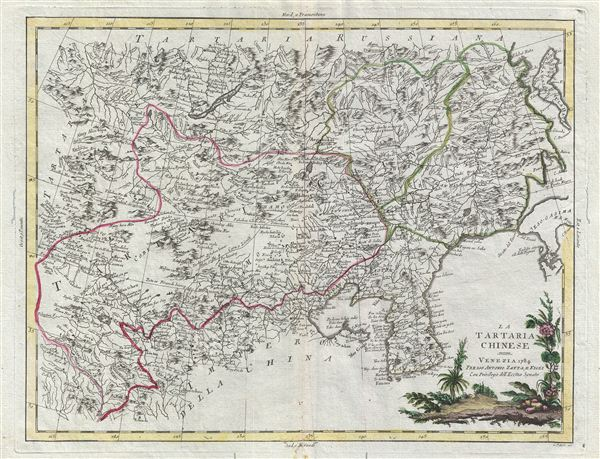
1784 map of Chinese Tartary and Korea

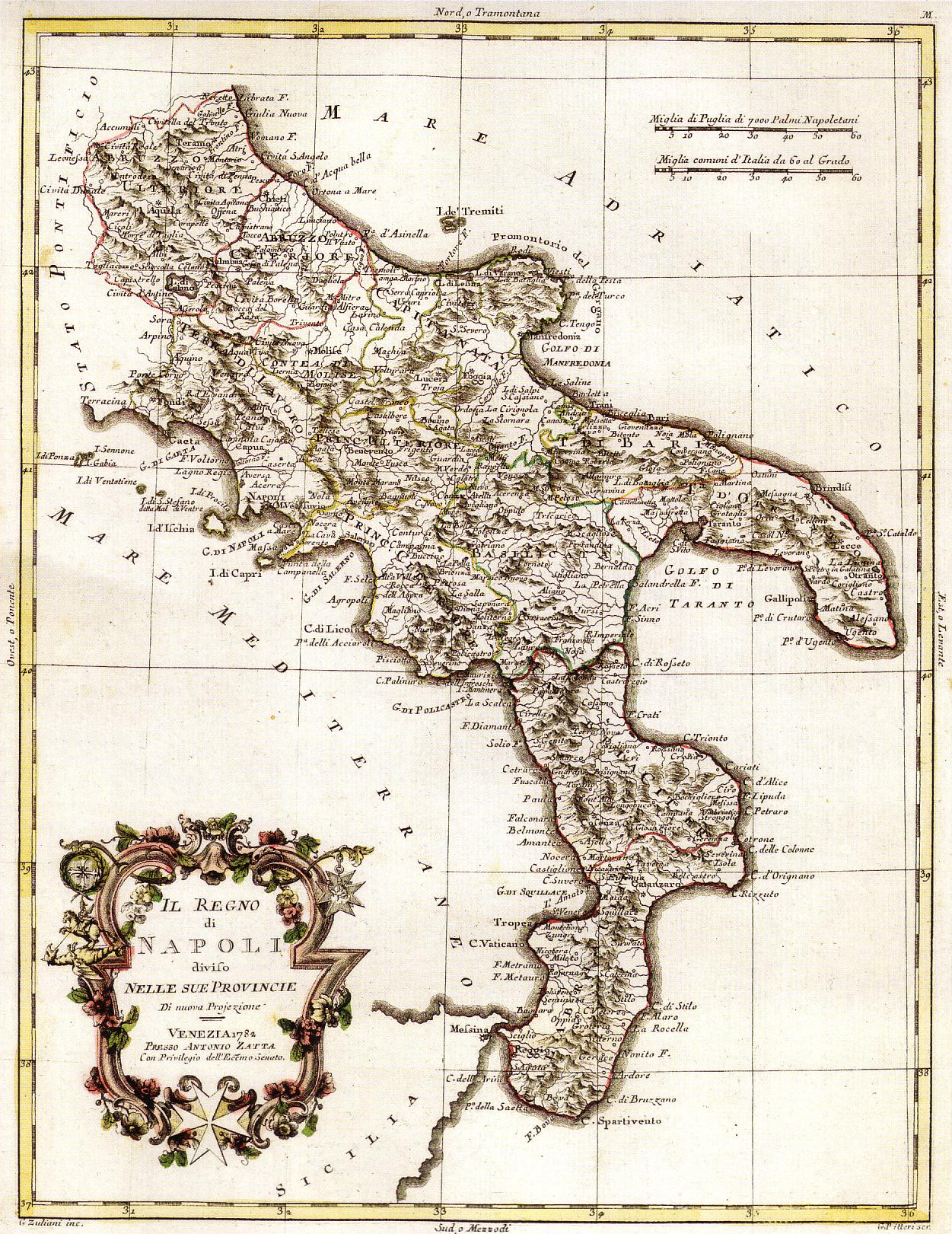
1782 map of the Kingdom of Naples

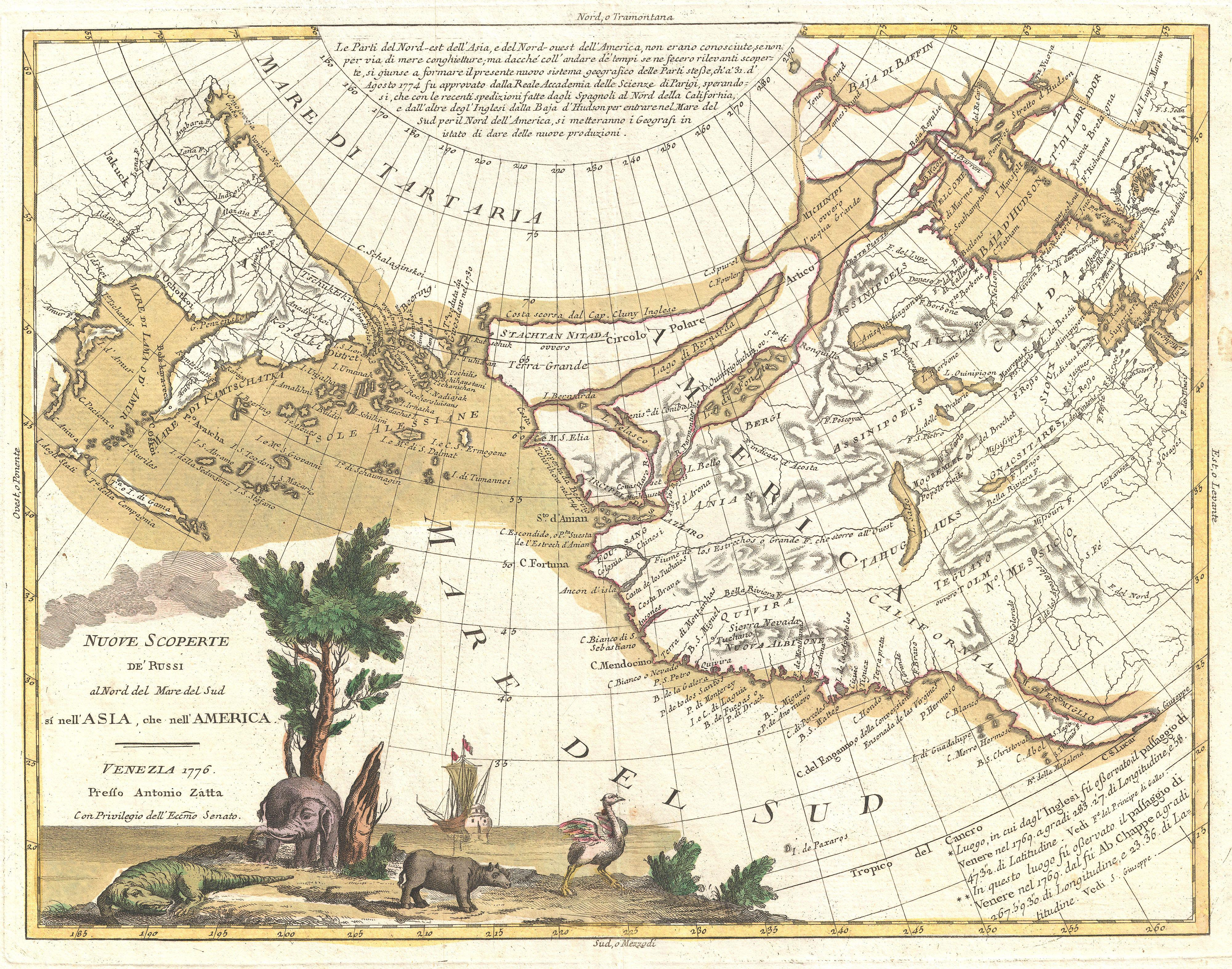
1776 map of the North Pacific coast, particularly of North America. Note the erroneous presence of a Chinese colony "Fou-Sang", and the rumoured Strait of Anián.

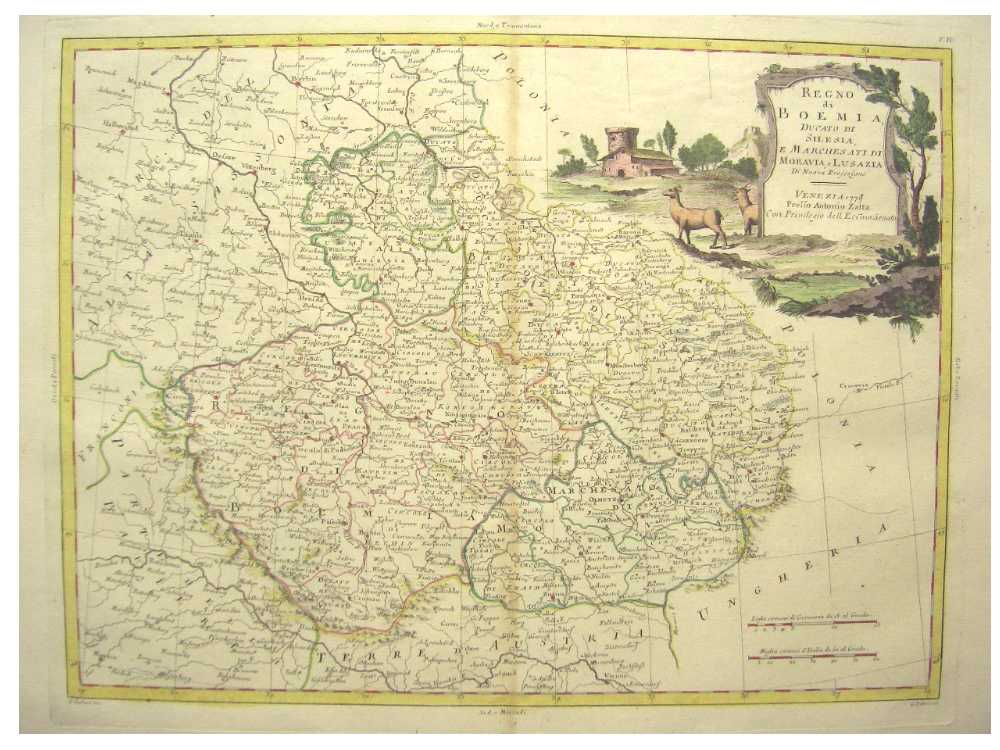
1779 map of the Kingdom of Bohemia

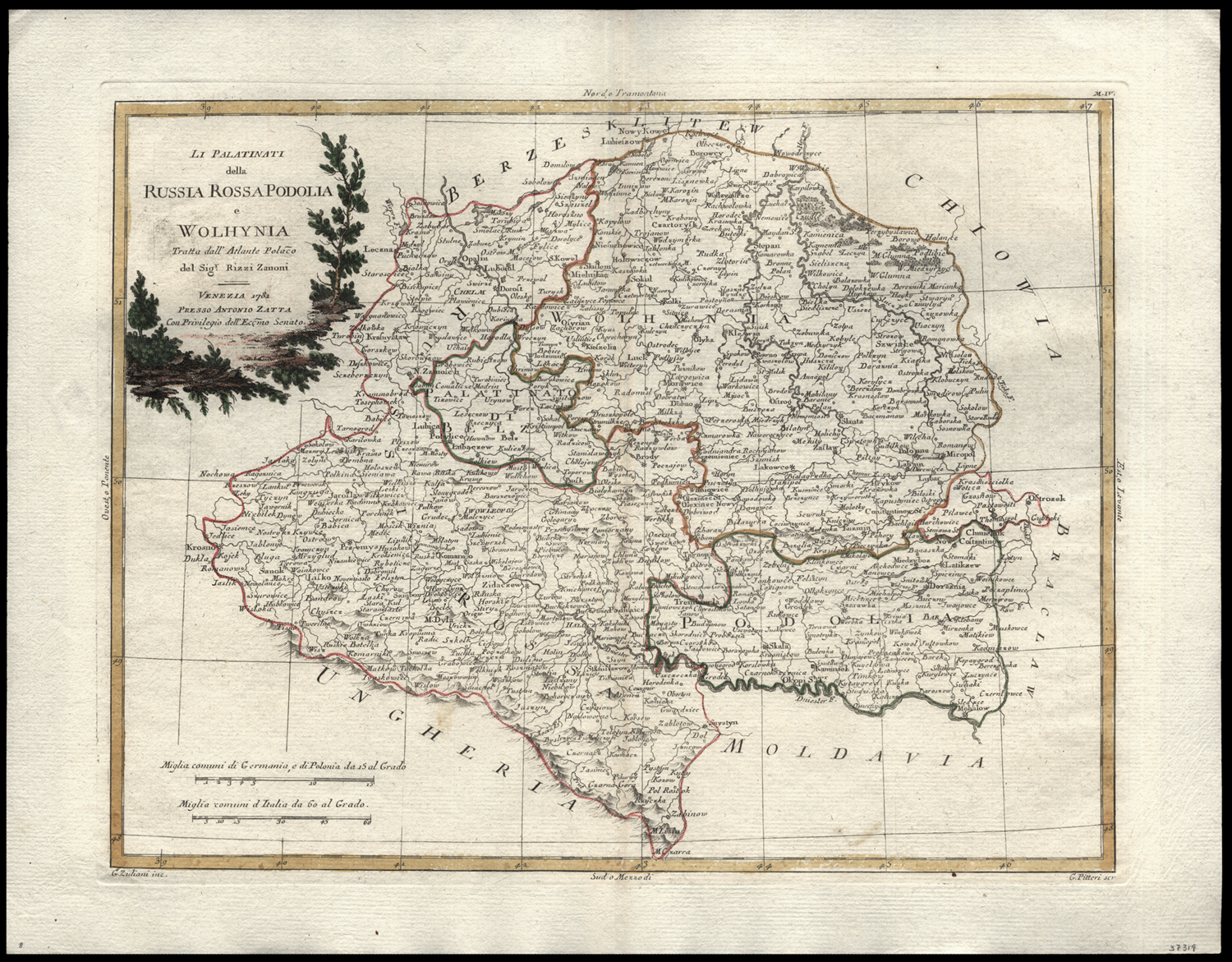
1781 map of Eastern Europe

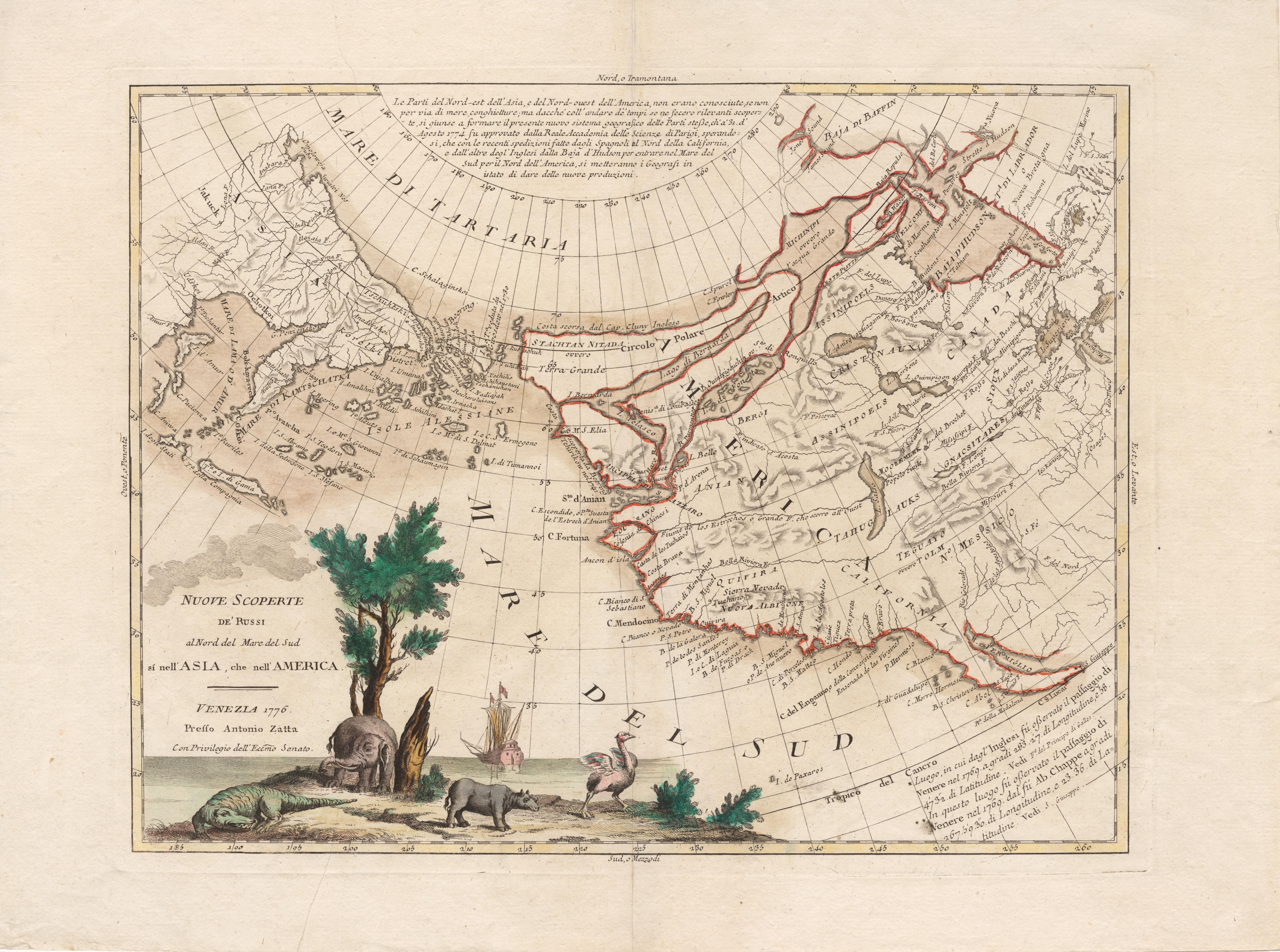
Another version of the above map of the North Pacific (1776)

== See also ==
- Sea of the West
