= Sea of the West =

Geographic misconception of an inland sea in the Pacific Northwest

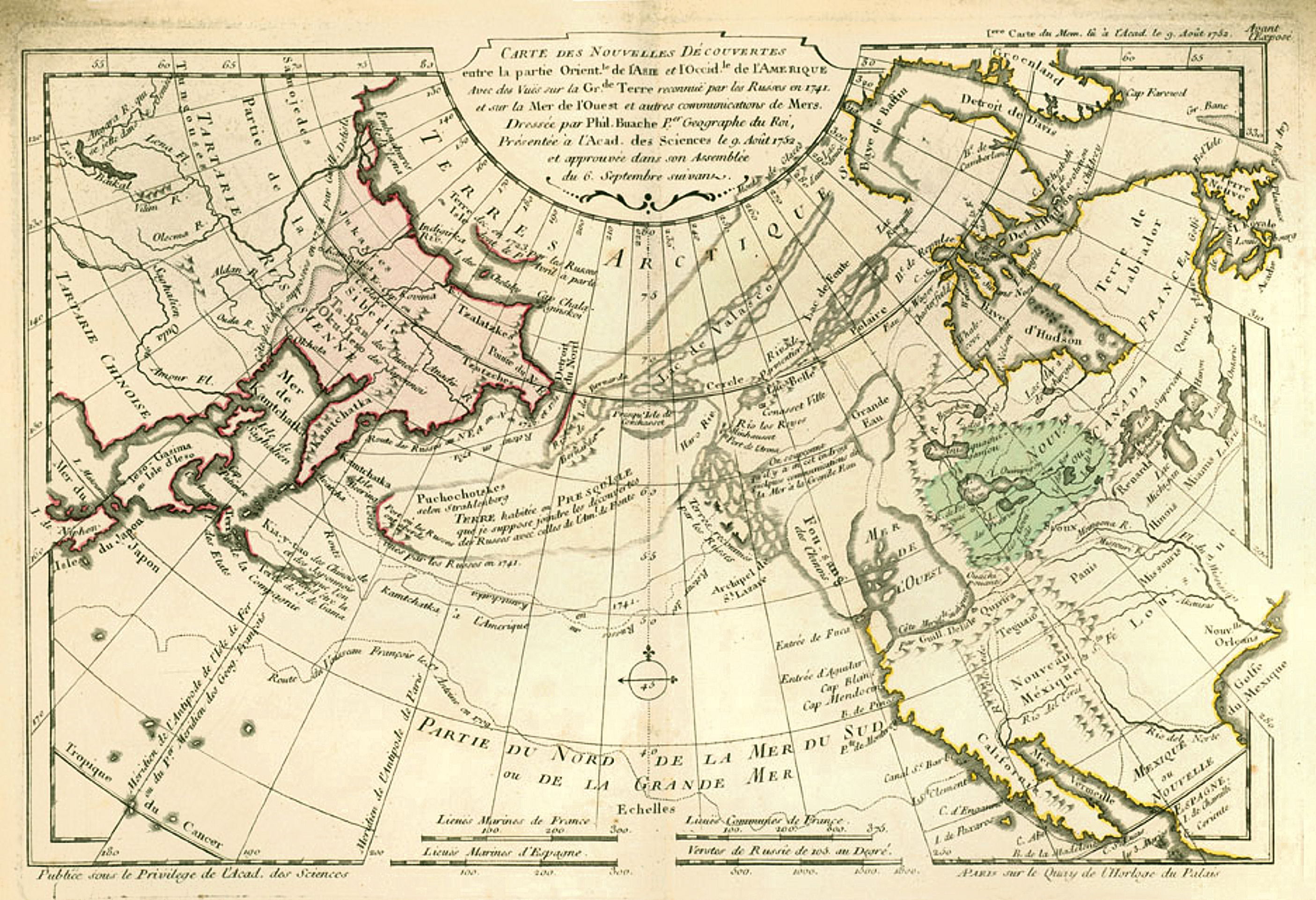
Buache, 1753, demonstrating the Mer de l'Ouest model developed by Joseph-Nicolas Delisle. California is at the lower right; the mythical sea is above it.

The Sea of the West, or Mer de l'Ouest, was a geographic misconception of an inland sea in the Pacific Northwest that appeared on many maps of the 18th century. The depiction was particularly common on French maps. The sea was supposed to be connected to the Pacific Ocean by at least one strait. Many different conjectures about the sea's shape, size, and position appeared on maps of the period.

Belief in the sea's existence derived from writings describing two voyages of discovery, one by an Admiral Bartholomew de Fonte, and one by Juan de Fuca. De Fuca's voyage might have happened, but his account is now known to have contained many distortions and confabulations. Admiral de Fonte, on the other hand, is not known to be a historical figure, and the account of his voyage is fiction. Several maps in the early 1700s depicted the sea, but interest and belief in its existence waned until the mid 1700s, when, fairly suddenly, Mer de l'Ouest reappeared on maps and quickly became common for several decades.

European knowledge of the region gradually improved such that belief in the inland sea became untenable before 1800.

== Origins ==
Juan de Fuca was born Ioannis Phokás (Greek: Ἰωάννης Φωκᾶς) in the Ionian Islands of Greece in 1536. Through an account by Michael Lok, de Fuca claimed to have been in the service of the Spanish Crown for decades, during which he had traveled in the Far East. By 1587, he was purportedly stranded in New Spain when his galleon was captured by Thomas Cavendish. Under sponsorship of the Viceroy of New Spain, de Fuca claimed to have piloted a voyage up the western coast of North America in 1592, reaching a strait into an inland sea at latitude 47°. The feature now known as the Strait of Juan de Fuca is at 48°N, so de Fuca's claim to have been there is plausible. However, de Fuca's description of the region, as conveyed by Lok in 1625, is not recognizable and is considered to be largely an invention, either by Lok or by de Fuca himself.

Michael Lok's involvement is significant because Lok was the principal patron of the Frobisher Expedition in search of a Northwest Passage. The riches of the Pacific were very distant from Europe, such that much treasure and lives had been expended and lost in lengthy and dangerous passage between the two regions. For hundreds of years, finding a passage from the Atlantic to the Pacific by some means more direct and less treacherous than the Straits of Magellan was high priority for European powers. The prospect of royal patronage, riches, and fame inspired dreamers, schemers, and explorers to search for such a route. This encouraged an environment of intrigue and rumor. Imaginary voyages, whether into a Northwest Passage or to treasure islands, found easy audience.

Whether based on the de Fuca account or otherwise, a few manuscript maps in the 1600s showed speculative geography that included branches of the Pacific Ocean protruding deeply into the North American continent. One such map from the late 1630s held by the Yale Center for British Art shows such a branch reaching as close as a few hundred miles from the east coast. Apparently inspired by these inventions, Guillaume Delisle drew several maps by hand between 1695 and about 1700 that portray such eastern intrusions of the Pacific Ocean. Joseph-Nicolas Delisle, Guillaume's half-brother, printed copies of one of these maps. Guillaume continued drafting and revising his conception of this western sea over decades, but he never published any maps depicting the Sea of the West despite his prolific output of printed maps. A few maps based on Delisle's were produced over the next several decades.

As cartographer to the king and teacher of his children, Guillaume Delisle's ideas had influence. On his earliest manuscript, Delisle wrote concerning the sea, ...pas encore découverte mais autorisée' par le rapport de plusieurs savages qui assurent avoir ete' (not yet discovered but authorized by the report of several savages who claim to have been there). In 1716, the governor of New France had produced a memoir sketching out a water route from Lake Winnipeg to the Sea of the West. The French Ministry of Marine pressured for exploration, but would not fund expeditions. The French Canadians, on the other hand, were interested in the fur trade. In 1731, Pierre Gaultier de Varennes, sieur de La Vérendrye was hired with the dual commissions of exploration and developing fur trade routes. Over the course of the next twelve years, La Vérendrye's expeditions pushed as far west as Saskatchewan and Wyoming in their search for furs, the "River of the West" (possibly the Columbia River), and the Sea of the West. By 1743, the French Ministry of Marine had tired of La Vérendrye, suspecting him of trading furs when he should have been exploring, and pressured him into resigning.

In 1708, a new account of a fantastic voyage had emerged that would eventually become highly influential. In April of that year, a short-lived English periodical named Monthly Miscellany, or Memoirs for the Curious published an alleged letter by one Admiral Bartholomew de Fonte. The letter was supposedly translated from Spanish. It gave a detailed narrative of a voyage undertaken in 1640 to the northwestern coast of North America, dealings with the natives, passage into a great inland sea, long, elaborate waterways into the interior of the continent, and probable connection to the eastern coasts of North America. Presumably due to the magazine's obscurity, the account did not inspire any maps for decades. That would change.

== Development ==
The Sea of the West theme was ignored by most mapmakers until 1750. In that year, Joseph-Nicolas Delisle commissioned Philippe Buache to draft a map with a radical new portrayal of Mer de l'Ouest (literally, "Western Sea" but usually found on English maps as "Sea of the West"), crediting de Fonte with explorations there. Buache had married Guillaume Delisle's daughter, making Nicolas his uncle and inheriting Guillaume's printing plates and stock of maps by marriage. Nicolas presented this manuscript to the Royal Academy of Sciences, where it incited controversy. Buache published this map in 1752, and Nicolas further stoked the controversy with his 1753 publication, Nouvelles Cartes des Découvertes de l'Amiral de Fonte: et autres Navigateurs. In that book, he presents diverse cartographic interpretations of the accounts of "Admiral de Fonte and other Spanish, Portuguese, English, Dutch, French, and Russian mariners who have sailed the North Seas, including their commentaries".

As "Professor of Mathematics at the Royal College, member of the Royal Academies of Sciences in Paris, London, Berlin, Stockholm, Uppsala, and the [Royal] Institute of Bologna; also named as the first Professor of Astronomy at the Imperial Academy of Saint Petersburg", Delisle had standing. The mapping world split between subscribers to and skeptics of the Mer de l'Ouest conception. Much debate ensued over a long period of time, spilling over into the communications of luminaries of the time. For example, in 1762, Benjamin Franklin penned a long analysis of the de Fonte letter, concluding, "If I have conjectured truly, this very Difference is a farther Proof that the Journal is really a Translation from the Spanish, and not, as some have supposed, an English Fiction." One day twenty-one years later, John Adams wrote in his diary that Franklin had mentioned the de Fonte voyage that day, still finding new reasons that it must be true.

The concept gained another boost in 1768 when mapmaker Thomas Jefferys wrote a treatise called The Great Probability of a North West Passage analyzing the de Fonte letter. McGuirk catalogued 94 distinct maps as portraying the Sea of the West in the 68 years before this time, as opposed to 160 in the next 30 years. Increasingly, English mapmakers opted to show the sea. The profusion of maps and the intense speculation surrounding the matter prompted the Spanish to launch an investigation into the voyage of de Fonte, who was supposed to have conducted a major expedition sponsored by the Spanish Crown. The investigation turned up no such character or expedition mentioned in Spanish archives.

McGuirk described eight distinct cartographic interpretations of the sea's shape and extent. With a few aberrations, each of the 239 Mer de l'Ouest maps he catalogued is based on one of those archetypes. It is not always clear how an archetype developed, but many of them were sincere efforts at interpreting the de Fonte letter.

Some of the more famous mapmakers who produced maps depicting the sea include:

- Antonio Zatta
- Charles François Delamarche
- Denis Diderot
- Didier Robert de Vaugondy
- Edme Mentelle
- Emanuel Bowen
- Jacques-Nicolas Bellin
- Jean Baptiste Bourguignon d'Anville
- Jean Baptiste Nolin
- Jedediah Morse
- Leonhard Euler
- Louis Brion de la Tour
- Philippe Buache
- Pierre Mortier
- Rigobert Bonne
- Robert Sayer
- Thomas Bowen
- Thomas Jefferys
- Thomas Kitchin
- William Faden

== Disappearance ==
By the late 1700s, European presence in the northeast Pacific, and the flow of information from it, cast serious doubt on the Sea of the West conjecture. Coming from his explorations of Hawaii in 1778, James Cook sailed to what is now the Oregon coast, along the entire northwest coastline, through the Bering Strait, and into the Chukchi Sea in northern Alaska. His explorations and surveys were not systematic, but nevertheless, his discoveries, and lack of discoveries, quickly made their way onto many maps that completely rearranged the old ideas about the region. His explorations gave form to the coastlines of what are now southern Alaska, British Columbia, Oregon, and Washington State. Combined with information trickling out of Russia about the explorations of Vitus Bering decades earlier, and subsequent Russian presence in the area, the prospects of finding either a Northwest Passage or a great sea in the Pacific Northwest dwindled.

Information did not always travel rapidly or thoroughly. Publishers did not always know whether to accept the latest claims about discoveries, nor did they wish to spend the money to revise their maps. While fewer, maps depicting the Sea of the West continued to be published even after Cook's reports became widespread. The last original depiction that was intended to convey the reality of the sea appeared in 1790 in John Meares's Voyage Made in the Year 1788 and 1789, From China to the North West Coast of America. This representation incorporated what appears to be Vancouver Island as a sort of shield behind which was to be found an indistinct sea. Captain George Vancouver's account of his voyage of 1791–1792, along with his detailed, expert mapping, left no room for doubt: The Sea of the West was a myth. Nevertheless, a few maps still depicting the sea appeared up until about 1810.

== See also ==
- Early knowledge of the Pacific Northwest
