= Early knowledge of the Pacific Northwest =

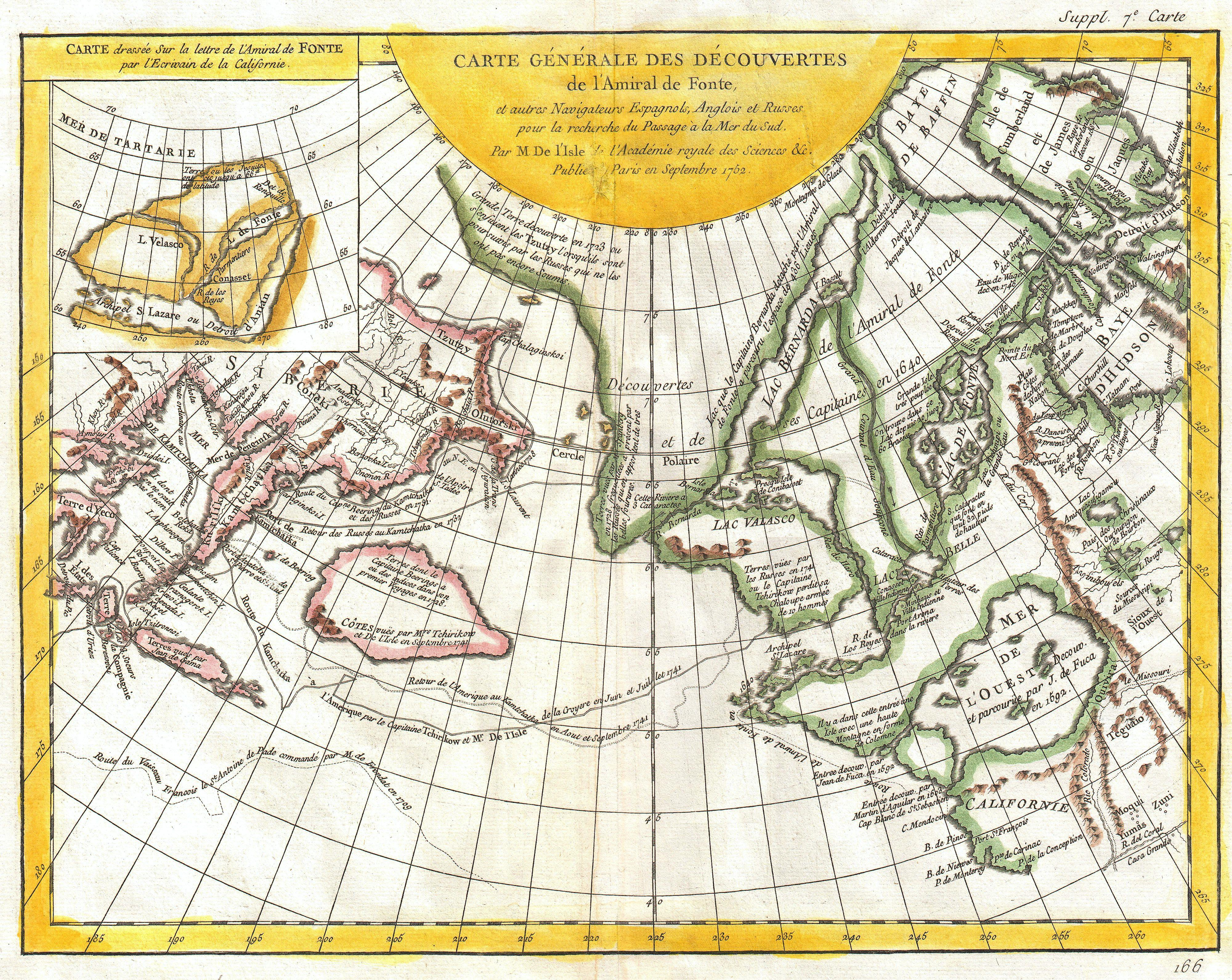
1772 Vaugondy and Diderot Map of the Pacific Northwest and the Northwest Passage - Carte Generale des Decouvertes de l'Amiral de Fonte et Autres Navigateurs Espagnols, Anglois et Russes pour la Recherche du Passage a la Mer du Sud.

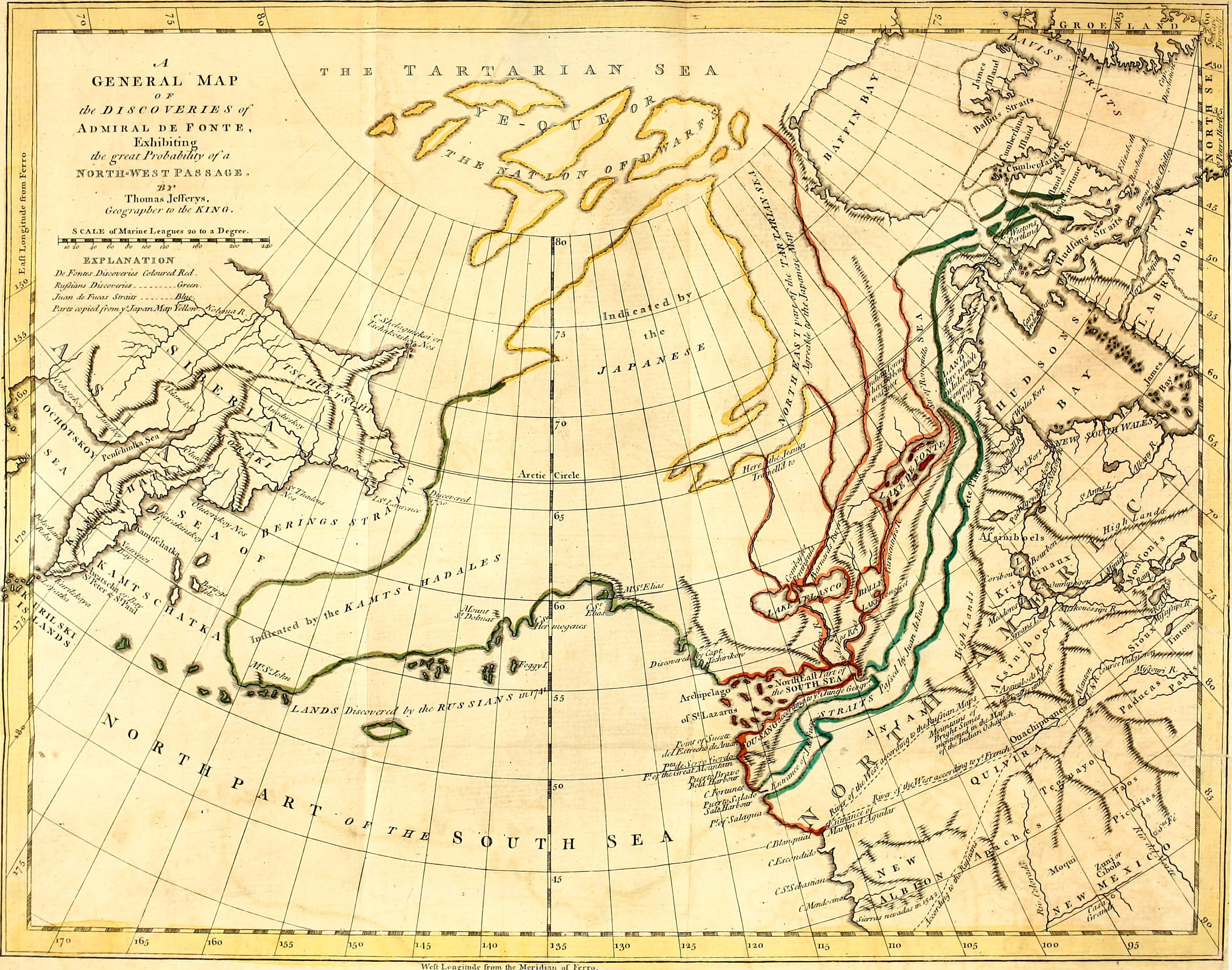
The great probability of a North West Passage: deduced from observations on the letter of Admiral de Fonte, who sailed from the Callao of Lima on the discovery of a communication between the South Sea and the Atlantic Ocean. Proving the authenticity of the Admiral's letter

The Pacific Northwest coast of North America was one of the last coastlines reached by European explorers. In terms of sailing time from Europe, it was one of the most distant places on earth. This article covers what Europeans knew or thought they knew before the area was explored by Captain Cook in 1778.

It is not clear what the Chinese and Japanese knew of the area to the north. The accuracy of the Strait of Anián story implies that they may have known something.

The Spaniards sent some expeditions north from Mexico but found little to interest them. In 1542, Juan Rodríguez Cabrillo reached a point north of San Francisco. In 1579 Drake landed somewhere on the coast above 43 degrees N latitude. In 1592 Juan de Fuca may have reached Puget Sound, Washington. In 1602 one of Sebastián Vizcaíno's ships reached Oregon. This was the last northward exploration for 150 years.

Strait of Anian: From about 1562 many European geographers thought there was a Strait of Anián, perhaps near the Bering Strait. Some thought it might be the west end of the Northwest Passage. Where this idea came from is unknown.

de Fuca: In 1592 Juan de Fuca may have reached Puget Sound, Washington. The documentation is poor and some have considered his voyage mythical.

de Fonte: The story of Bartholomew de Fonte first appeared in 1708 in a short-lived English periodical called Memoirs for the Curious. In 1744 Arthur Dobbs revived it in An Account of the Countries Adjoining Hudson's Bay. In 1752 Joseph Nicholas Delisle published a memoir on what was known of the Pacific Northwest. He said that in 1640 de Fonte, a Spanish Admiral, sailed 5000 miles north from Lima to 53° north where he entered a Rio de los Reyes. This took him through a series of waterways until, at the Strait of Ronquillo, he met a ship from Boston commanded by a Captain Shapely. The accompanying map shows: -

- Point Conception (California)
- Port St. Francois (San Francisco, California)
- Bahía de los Pinos (Monterey Bay, California)
- Cape Mendocino (California)
- Cape Sebastian (Oregon)
- Cape Blanco (Oregon), discovered by Martín de Aguilar in 1603 - 42°50′15″N 124°33′50″W

It shows:

- The route from Kamchatka to America taken by Aleksei Chirikov and Louis De l'Isle de la Croyère in 1741.
- Lands seen by the Russians in 1741 where Capt. Chirikov lost his armed boat with 10 men - now Prince of Wales Island, (55°37′55″N 132°54′27″W).
- Coasts seen by Messrs. Tchirikow and De l'Isle in September 1741 - now Adak Island (51.78°N 176.64°W).

It also shows an enormous San Francisco Bay ("Sea of the West") extending to Colorado, its north entrance being the Strait of Juan de Fuca. In the Puget Sound area the Rio de los Reyes leads to a huge lake in the center of the continent called Lake de Fonte. The east end of the lake leads through a Strait of Ronquillo to Hudson Bay near what is marked as Wager Bay (Eau de Wager) (65°30′N 89°00′W) (with Cape Dobbs at its eastern end) and Chesterfield Inlet (although the area between them is incorrectly shown as an island). At about 60° there is a third inlet leading to a long Lake Bernarda which almost reaches Baffin Bay. The third inlet is connected to Rio de los Reyes by two channels. In 1753 Gerhard Müller published an anonymous rebuttal. In 1755 Denis Diderot published a version of Delisle's map in the Encyclopedié. In 1757 Andrés Marcos Burriel published a Noticia de la California in which he said he could find no reference to de Fonte in the Spanish archives. The appendix giving this information did not appear in the English or French translations. in 1783, one year before the publication of Cook's journals, Jean Nolin published a map incorporating Delisle's geography, including an even larger Sea of the West.

Today Fonte’s letter is universally considered to have been a hoax.

Maldonado: Lorenzo Ferrer Maldonado was a Spaniard who had been tried for forgery and counterfeiting. In 1609 he presented to the Spanish court a Relation describing how he had crossed the Northwest Passage in 1588. He said he sailed through Davis Strait to 70° North. Although it was February the sea never froze. He then sailed 790 leagues SW and WSW and reached the Strait of Anian at 60°N. At its mouth he found a large harbor where he met a ship with gold and pearls manned by Lutherans from the Baltic ports. In June he returned, finding temperatures north of the Arctic Circle warmer than those of Spain. A copy of the Relation was found in the Spanish archives 180 years later. In 1791 Alessandro Malaspina was told to look for Maldonado's strait.

Other explorers: Vitus Bering entered the Bering Strait in 1728. In 1771 Samuel Hearne reached the Arctic coast from Hudson Bay, proving that there was no saltwater waterway at this latitude. In 1778 James Cook followed the coast from Oregon to the Bering Strait. People like George Vancouver who followed Cook had to examine each inlet very closely since any one of them could have been the exit from the northwest passage. For the rest see History of the Pacific Northwest.
