= Brobdingnag =

Fictional land in Gulliver's Travels

- Gulliver's Travels location
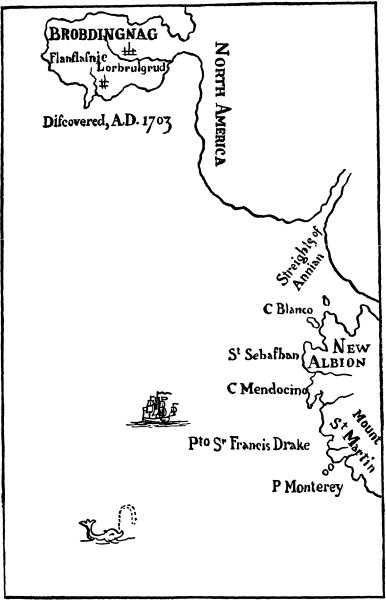
- Map of Brobdingnag (original map, Pt II, Gulliver's Travels)
- Created by: Jonathan Swift
- Genre: Satire

In-universe information
- Other name: Brobdingrag
- Type: Monarchy
- Ethnic group: Brobdingnagians
- Locations: Lorbrulgrud (capital)

Brobdingnag is a fictional land that is occupied by giants, in Jonathan Swift's 1726 satirical novel Gulliver's Travels. The story's main character, Lemuel Gulliver, visits the land after the ship on which he is travelling is blown off course. As a result, he becomes separated from a party exploring the unknown land. In the second preface to the book, in 1727, Gulliver laments that the publisher misspelled the land's name, which Gulliver asserts is actually called Brobdingrag.

The adjective Brobdingnagian has come to describe anything of colossal size.

== Location ==
Brobdingnag is placed by Swift into the real world, he describes its location and geography in Part II of Gullivers Travels and provides a map showing where it is. However, the accounts are somewhat contradictory.

The map printed at the beginning of Part II indicates that Brobdingnag is located on the northwest coast of North America, in probably what is now British Columbia. The map shows (from south to north) Point Monterey, Port Sir Francis Drake, Cape Mendocino, Cape St. Sebastian, Cape Blanco and the semi-mythical Strait of Anián, all locations on the Pacific coast of North America, and depicts Brobdingnag as a peninsula extending west into the Pacific to the north of the Straits.

In the book, Gulliver describes his voyage from England. After wintering at the Cape of Good Hope, the ship reached a latitude of five degrees south, northward of Madagascar in March 1703, and the Moluccas, "about three degrees northwards of the line" in April. From there, a storm drives the ship "about five hundred leagues to the east" (this would place the ship still in Micronesia), after which the crew determine to "hold on the same course rather than turn more northerly, which might have brought us to the north-west parts of Great Tartary". They sighted land, which Gulliver later discovers is Brobdingnag, on 16 June 1703.

Brobdingnag is claimed to be a continent-sized peninsula 6,000 miles (9,700 km) long and 3,000–5,000 miles (4,800–8,000 km) miles wide, which based on the location given by Gulliver would suggest that it covers most of the North Pacific. Contrariwise, his map shows Brobdingnag to be of a similar size and extent as the present-day Washington, and his description of the voyage puts it at a six-week voyage from the Moluccas.

Swift was highly sceptical about the reliability of travel writings, and the unlikely geographic descriptions parody many unreliable travel books published at the time which Percy Adams describes as "travel lies".

== Scale ==
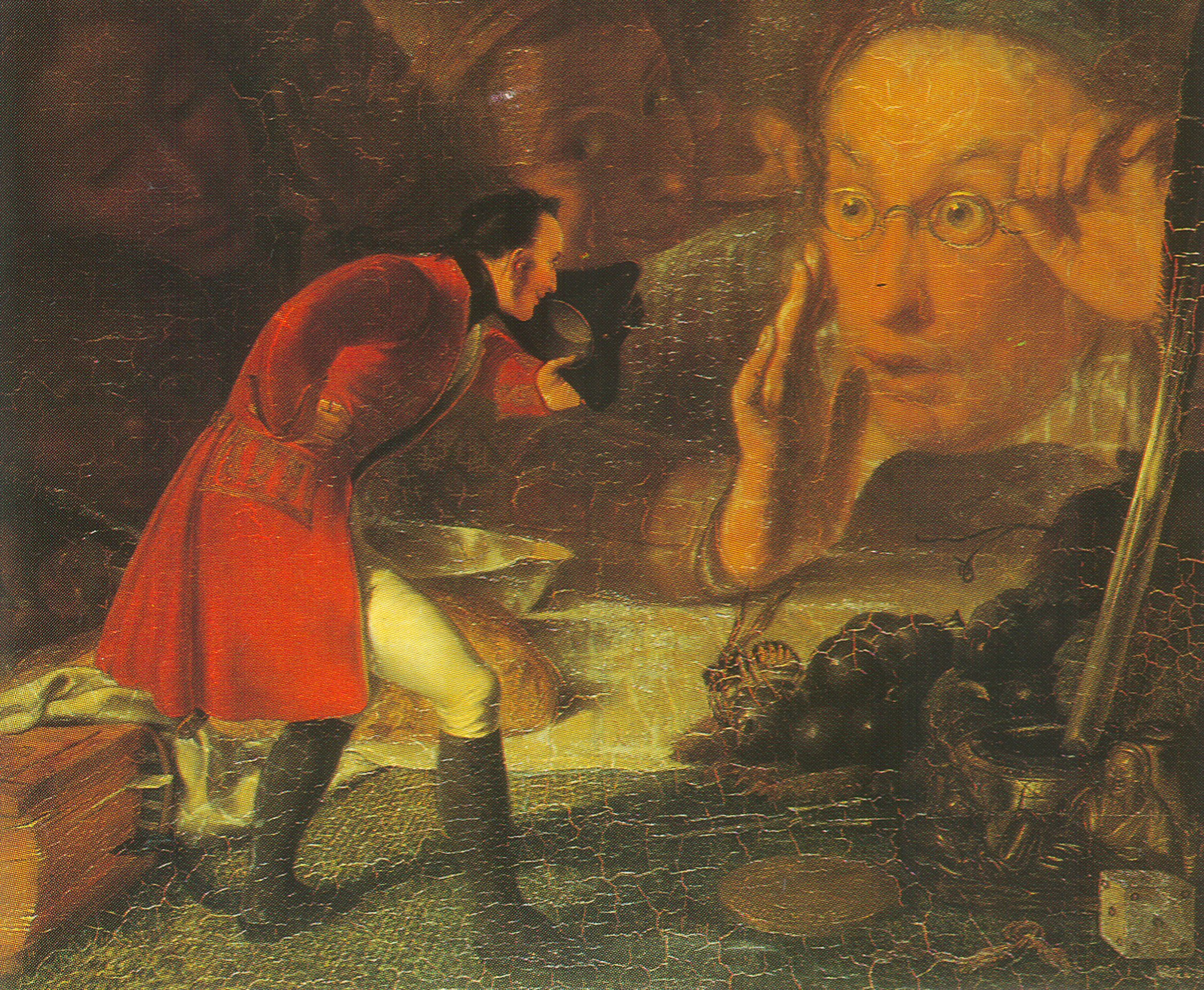
Gulliver in Brobdingnag, by Richard Redgrave, Victoria and Albert Museum

Gulliver states that a nine-year-old girl named Glumdalclitch, who teaches him the language, stands "not above 40 feet tall, being small for her age". In at least two cases, he states explicitly that a Brobdingnagian's eyes are "above sixty feet" from the ground, giving a ratio of at least eleven to one. He also states that he would "appear as inconsiderable to this nation as a Lilliputian would be among us", indicating the same twelve to one ratio given for Lilliput was intended. This is further reinforced by hailstone being almost 1,800 times as heavy as in Europe (with 1/12 ratio, it should be 1,728). The queen's court dwarf, the shortest native on record, is not quite thirty feet tall, which, on a 1/12 scale, would make him equivalent to a person a bit below thirty inches, the height of the Chinese dwarf He Pingping. Gulliver also describes visiting the chief temple in Lorbrulgrud, whose tower was the highest in the kingdom, but reports he "came back disappointed, for the height is not above three thousand foot", which "allowing for the difference in size between those people and us in Europe" is "not equal in proportion to Salisbury steeple". Outside world whales are stated to be of a size that one man can barely carry, and are eaten by common folk if they find a beached specimen.

== Geography ==
Brobdingnag is said to be located between Japan and California, extending six thousand miles in length, and between three and five thousand miles in breadth. It is described as a peninsula, terminated to the northeast by a range of volcanoes up to 30 miles (48 km) high separating the country from unknown land beyond. It is surrounded on three other sides by the ocean, and the people have never been able to develop ocean-going ships. The land "has 51 cities, near 100 walled towns, and a great number of villages".

Lorbrulgrud is claimed to be the capital with the king having a seaside palace at Flanflasnic. The capital "contains above 80,000 houses" and "is in length three glonglungs (about fifty four English miles) and two and a half in breadth". Gulliver tells us that Lorbrulgrud was "situated near the middle of that empire" and was three thousand miles distant from the farmer's house on the coast, that the journey took ten weeks and that they "crossed five or six rivers many degrees broader and deeper than the Nile or the Ganges", and "there was hardly a rivulet smaller than the Thames at London Bridge".

== People, flora and fauna ==
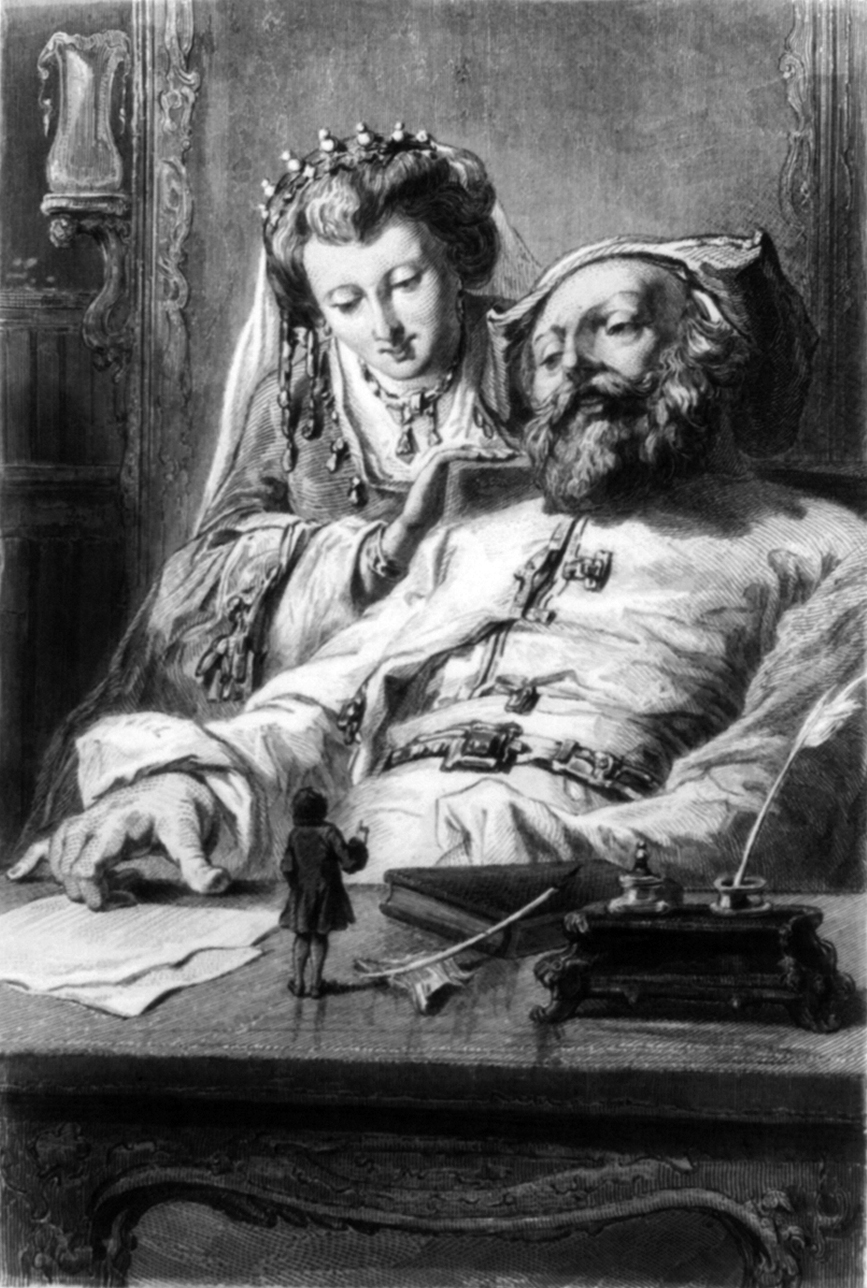
Gulliver with the King and Queen of Brobdingnag, from a French edition of Gulliver's Travels (1850s)

The people of Brobdingnag are described as giants who are as tall as 60 feet high and whose stride is ten yards.

All of the other animals and plants, and even natural features such as rivers and even hail, are in proportion. The rats are the size of mastiffs, with tails "two yards long, wanting an inch", while mastiffs are "equal in bulk to four elephants". Gulliver describes flies "as big as a Dunstable lark", and wasps the size of partridges, with stings "an inch and a half long, and sharp as needles". This also means that the country is far more dangerous for people of normal human size, as evidenced by Gulliver using his hanger far more often here—namely, on attacking vermin—than in any other of the strange countries he visited, but the people are civilised. A splacknuck is an animal about 6 feet (1.8 m) long, to which Gulliver is compared in size, although it is never explained which animal it corresponds to.

Fossil records are claimed to show that the ancestors of the Brobdingnagians were once even larger, likely as an allusion to the medieval tendency of supporting similar claims with bones that had, around Swift's time, started being identified as belonging to elephants, mastodons and even whales. The King of Brobdingnag argues that the race has deteriorated.

The language of Brobdingnag is depicted as being of a character distinctively different from that of Lilliput.

== History and government ==
Gulliver relates that, in the past, there were battles between the monarchy, nobility, and people resulting in a number of civil wars ending in a treaty. The monarchy is based on reason. City officials are elected by ballot. The King of Brobdingnag finds English institutions and behaviour wanting in comparison with his country's. Based on Gulliver's descriptions of their behaviour, the King describes the English as "the most pernicious race of little odious vermin that nature ever suffered to crawl upon the surface of the earth". Swift intended the moral relationship between the English and Brobdingnagians to be as disproportionate as the physical relationship. The King of Brobdingnag is considered to be based on Sir William Steele, a statesman and writer, whom Swift worked for early in his career. Some critics believed it to be based on Sir William Temple.

The army of Brobdingnag is claimed to be large with 207,000 troops including 32,000 cavalry although the society has no known enemies. The local nobility commands the forces; firearms and gunpowder are unknown to them. The King scolds Gulliver when he tries to interest the statesman in the use of gunpowder.

The laws of Brobdingnag are simple and easy to follow. There is little civil litigation. Murderers are beheaded.

In Gulliver's in-character preface to the story, headed A letter from Captain Gulliver to his cousin Sympson, he specifies that the correct spelling is in fact "... Brobdingrag (for so the word should have been spelt, and not erroneously Brobdingnag), ... [emphasis added]". This correction by the fictional author is a device used to add an element of verisimilitude to the story.

== Culture ==
Brobdingnagian culture consists of history, poetry, mathematics and ethics, mathematics being a particular strength. Printing has been long known but libraries are relatively small. The king has the largest library, which contains about one thousand volumes. The Brobdingnagians favour a clear literary style.

== Symbolism ==
The mismatch between body sizes of Brobdingnag giants and Gulliver is the main feature of the plot: as Dr Johnson stated with some derision in 1775, "once you have thought of big and little men, it is very easy to do all the rest". However, Swift investigates deeper: the mismatch between the world of Brobdingnag and Gulliver's size creates an environment akin to the one experienced by real-life babies, "Every child begins life in Brobdingnag" (cf. John Locke's children that "are Travellers newly arrived in a strange Country, of which they know nothing"). Brobdingnagians are nice to Gulliver, trying to teach him, providing with toys, while he yearns for comfort and approval, proudly demonstrating his achievements. The enlarged world diminishes adulthood. Child analogy is reinforced by a contrast between a bad parent (the farmer) and a good one (the King). The scene of being found in Brobdingnag: emergence from the safe confines of the ship into the world of giants - screaming - being picked up and looked upon - reception by the family - is an allusion to birth.

In each of the Gulliver journeys, Swift dismisses a particular aspect of high opinion that humanity holds about itself. The travel to Brobdingnag exposes the lack of maturity: Gulliver has to be saved by Brobdingnagians not just from the danger of the oversized world around him, but from his own follies: quarreling with a "dwarf", suggesting the King to use gunpowder on his subjects, seeing his own smallness, but overlooking narrowmindedness.

Brobdingnag can be interpreted as an outsider's view of England (the farther he goes away, the closer he comes to the own country, seen from a different perspective), while Gulliver's travel is similar to a life story of an English gentlemen of the time.

While traveling to and staying at Brobdingnag, he is always confined (aboard a ship, on a boat in a water tank, in a box); to go anywhere, he needs an adult to carry him. The box might symbolize the restriction of freedom, a prison, or a coffin. In the end, the box becomes a vehicle for freedom (symbolized by sea, possibly, the final freedom granted by death).

== Legacy ==
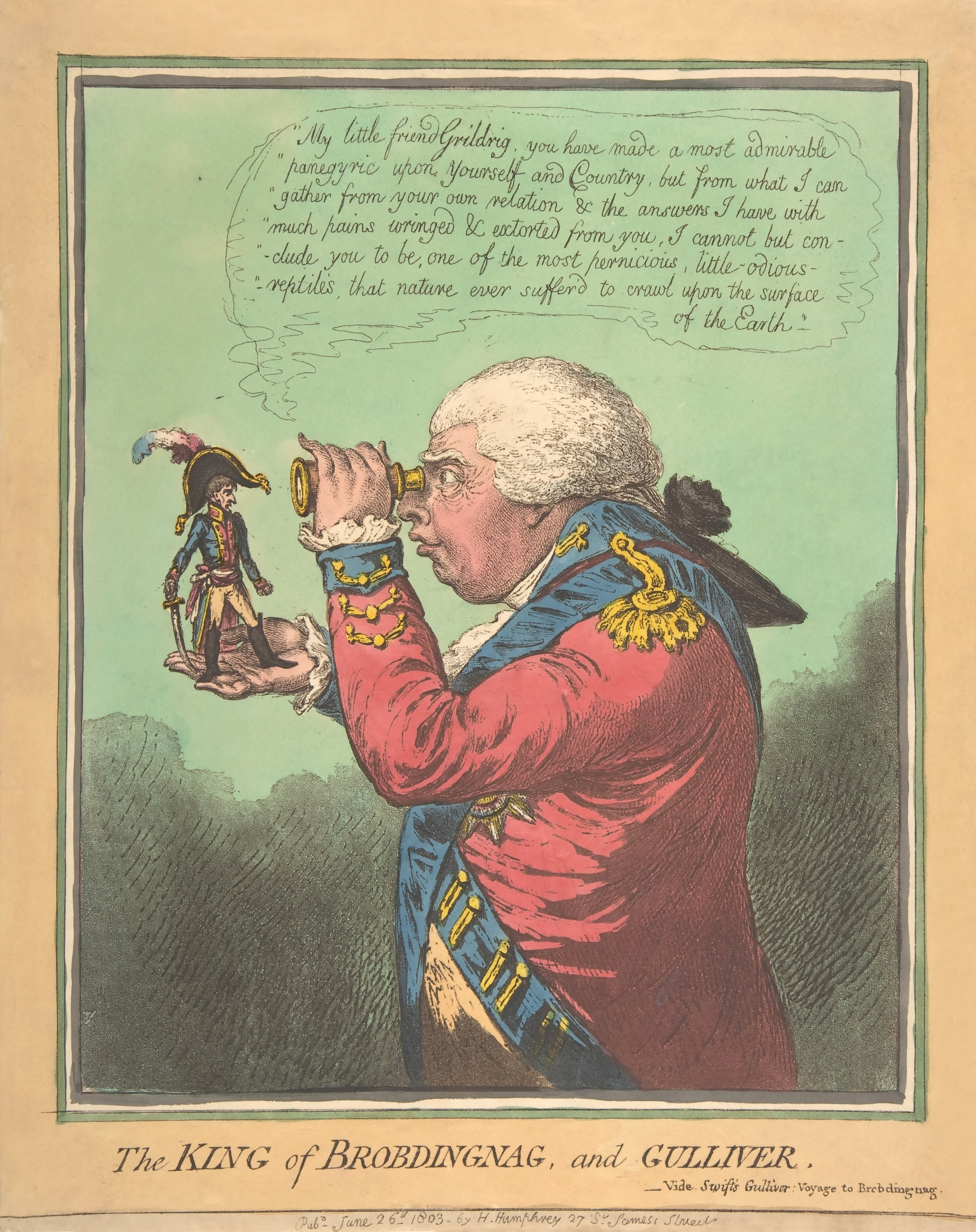
The King of Brobdingnag and Gulliver.–Vide. Swift's Gulliver: Voyage to Brobdingnag, now in the collection of the Metropolitan Museum of Art in New York

The land is the subject of James Gillray's satirical hand-coloured etching and aquatint print, titled The King of Brobdingnag and Gulliver.–Vide. Swift's Gulliver: Voyage to Brobdingnag. Produced in 1803, it shows a profile of George III of the United Kingdom, representing the Brobdingnagian king, holding a miniature Napoleon, representing Gulliver, while observing him through a spyglass. It was published on 26 June, five weeks after the breakdown of the Treaty of Amiens, which precipitated the Napoleonic Wars. The king's speech balloon in the top half of the print reads "My little friend Grildrig, (Note: Grildrig has the name given to Gulliver by the farmer's daughter Glumdalclitch in Brobdingnag) you have made a most admirable panegyric upon Yourself and Country, but from what I can gather from your own relation & the answers I have with much pains wringed & extorted from you, I cannot but conclude you to be one of the most pernicious, little-odious-reptiles, that nature ever suffer'd to crawl upon the surface of the Earth".

On Mars's largest moon, Phobos, the crater Grildrig is named because of Swift's 'prediction' of the two then undiscovered Martian moons, which his Laputan astronomers had discovered.

== See also ==
- Island gigantism
- Houyhnhnm
- Lilliput and Blefuscu
- Struldbrug
- Yahoo (Gulliver's Travels)

== Bibliography ==
- "Jonathan Swift." Concise Dictionary of British Literary Biography, Volume 2: Writers of the Restoration and Eighteenth Century, 1660–1789. Gale Research, 1992. Reproduced in Biography Resource Center. Farmington Hills, Michigan: Thomson Gale. 2005.
- Manguel, Alberto; and Gianni Guadalupi. "Brobdingnag", The Dictionary of Imaginary Places, Harcourt Brace, New York, 2000. ISBN 0-15-100541-9
- Lee, Brian S. (1998). "Gulliver in Brobdingnag: a journey back to infancy". English Academy Review. 15 (1): 116–129. doi:10.1080/10131759885310121. ISSN 1013-1752.
