= Edme Mentelle =

French geographer

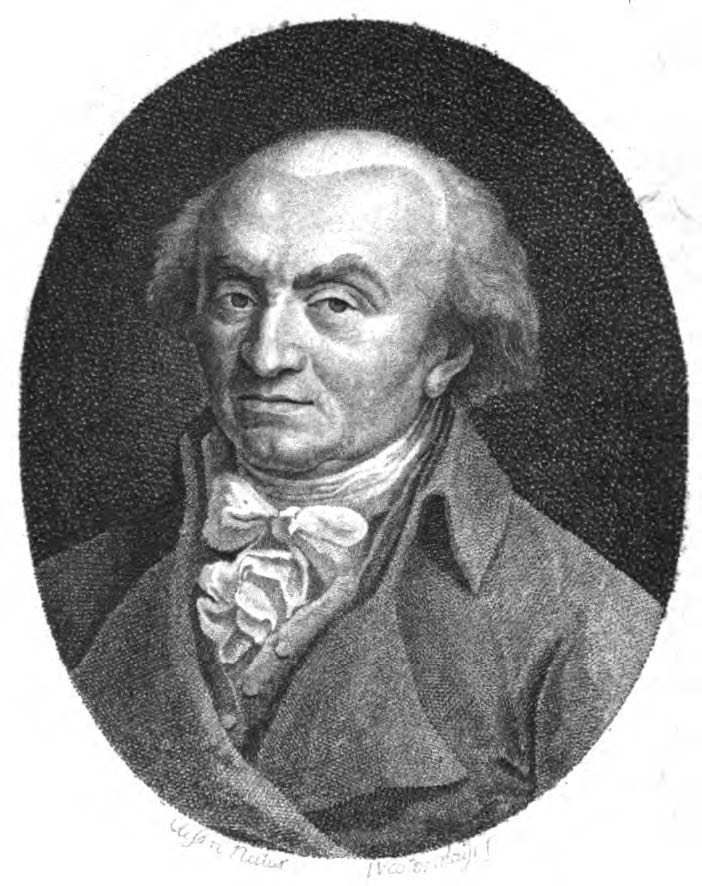
- Born: 11 October 1730; Paris
- Died: 29 December 1815 (aged 85); Paris
- Education: Collège de Beauvais
- Occupations: Geographer, educator, writer
- Spouse: Léone Mentelle (married 1766–1805)
- Children: 1
- Awards: Légion d'Honneur

Edme Mentelle (11 October 1730 – 29 December 1815) was a French geographer and educator. He taught at the École Militaire and the École Normale and was elected to the Institut National des Sciences et des Arts in 1795 (later the Institut de France). Mentelle's textbooks and atlases were widely used in the late eighteenth century, with his career spanning the monarchy, the French Revolution and the Napoleonic Empire.

== Early life ==
Mentelle was born in Paris on 11 October 1730, into a bourgeois family. Little is known of Mentelle's early life. Unlike his younger brother, François-Simon Mentelle, who studied in Paris under Philippe Buache and later worked with César-François Cassini de Thury, Edme received a more modest education in Beauvais under the historian and writer Jean-Baptiste Louis Crévier. Mentelle initially pursued a career in commerce, which proved unsuccessful, before obtaining employment as a minor government functionary in Paris.

His first publication, La mort de Polieucte (1751), was a poetic reworking of a classical subject. He subsequently published short poems, including contributions to the Mercure de France. In the late 1750s he turned to satire and drama. In 1757 he published a pseudonymous satirical letter criticising the French periodical press. The following year his play L'amour libérateur (1758) was performed in Bordeaux. He also published the satirical work Le porte-feuille du R. F. Gillet, which reflected his anticlerical views and commented on controversies surrounding the publication of the Encyclopédie.

== Career before the French Revolution ==
Mentelle's first geographical publication, Élémens de géographie (1758), was a school textbook surveying the continents and had a section devoted to France. Its publication coincided with growing debates over educational reform in eighteenth-century France. In 1760 Mentelle was appointed to teach geography and history at the École Militaire in Paris, where he combined the two subjects in his teaching. This approach informed his Manuel géographique, chronologique et historique, which was accompanied by numerous maps. He married Léone in 1766, whose father also taught at the École Militaire. They had at least one son, Waldemar. Léone died in 1805.

From the 1760s onward, Mentelle produced numerous geography and history textbooks, many of which went through multiple editions. Among his most successful pre-revolutionary works were Élémens de l'histoire romaine (1766; reissued 1773–74) and Cosmographie élémentaire (1781; reissued 1782, 1795, 1798–99). He later contributed the three-volume Géographie ancienne (1787–1793) to Charles-Joseph Panckoucke's Encyclopédie méthodique, as well as the three volumes of the Dictionnaire de géographie moderne (1784–1789). He also collaborated with Pierre-Gilles Chanlaire on the Atlas universel de géographie physique et politique, a large-scale cartographic work published in the late 1790s and containing 170 maps.

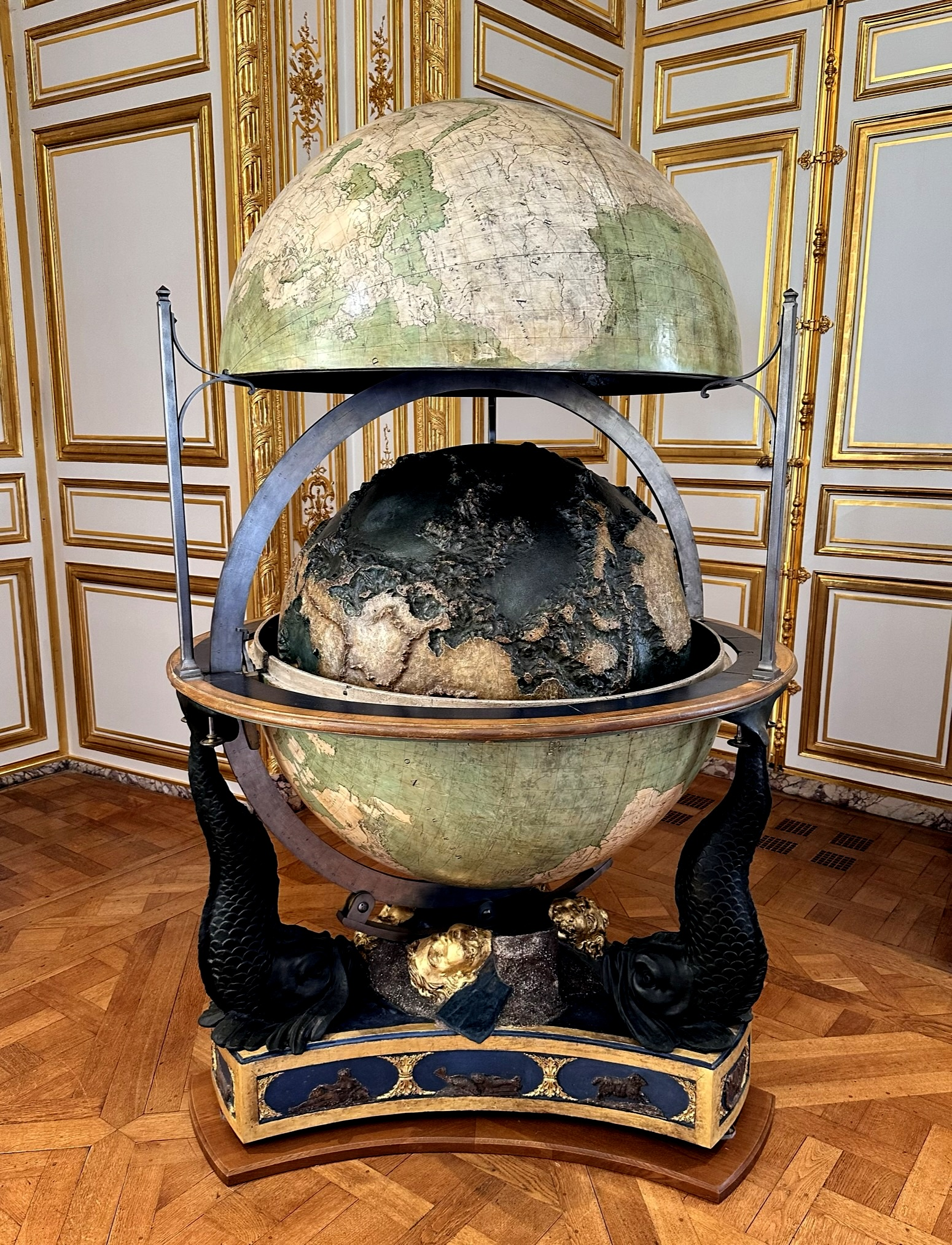
Mentelle's globe on display in the grand office of the Dauphin at the Palace of Versailles, in 2023.

Mentelle taught at the École Militaire during the reign of Louis XVI and had previously instructed the king's younger brother, Charles-Philipe, Count of Artois. In 1778 he was appointed historiographer to the Count. During the 1780s he participated in the geographical education of members of the royal household. In 1786 Mentelle designed an educational globe for Louis Joseph, Dauphin of France. Constructed by the engineer Jean-Tobie Mercklein and presented in 1788, the globe incorporated multiple removable layers representing physical and political geography. The globe, 2.4 metres (7 ft 10 in) tall, is preserved at the Palace of Versailles. The outer terrestrial globe can be separated into two hemispheres, revealing a celestial globe on the inside, showing the constellations and some of the brightest stars. There is also an inner wax globe representing the Earth's topography, which was the first relief globe ever made.

In the late 1780s Mentelle collaborated with Honoré Gabriel Riqueti, comte de Mirabeau, assisting in the preparation of a multi-volume study of Prussia and contributing geographical material and maps. The work drew in part on Mirabeau's earlier mission to Berlin and later became the subject of political controversy. By the eve of the French Revolution, Mentelle's residence in Paris served as a meeting place for geographers and scientists, including Jean-Baptiste Bourguignon d'Anville, Pierre-Simon Laplace, Joseph-Louis Lagrange, Antoine-Laurent de Lavoisier, and Gaspard Monge. He was also connected with intellectual circles associated with Jacques Pierre Brissot.

== Revolutionary and Napoleonic period ==
Map of Africa from Mentelle's atlas c. 1797

Map of Egypt from a later edition of Mentelle's Atlas universel (1807).

Following the outbreak of the French Revolution in 1789, Mentelle remained in Paris while several members of his family emigrated, including his son Waldemar to the United States. In correspondence from 1790, Mentelle described his financial difficulties, including the loss of a stipend and efforts to support himself through public courses. After the death of Mirabeau in 1791, he publicly supported revolutionary principles, publishing Lettre d'un auteur citoyen à la Commune de Paris en faveur de la liberté de la presse (1791), a pamphlet defending freedom of the press. During the early 1790s he became associated with republican intellectual circles linked to Jacques-Pierre Brissot and the Girondins. After the closure of the École Militaire, he was appointed "professeur public de géographie" and was granted rooms in the Louvre Palace, where he continued teaching. He published several textbooks reflecting the new administrative divisions of France, including Méthode courte et facile pour apprendre aisément et retenir sans peine la nouvelle géographie de la France (1791) and Tableau élémentaire de géographie de la République française (1792).

In 1795 Mentelle was appointed professor of geography at the newly established École Normale, where he lectured alongside Jean-Nicolas Buache. The same year he was elected to the Institut National des Sciences et des Arts (later the Institut de France) and is listed among the members of the Académie des Inscriptions et Belles-Lettres. He subsequently held teaching posts at various educational institutions in Paris and participated in governmental commissions relating to education and the arts. Among his principal works of the revolutionary period was La géographie enseignée par une méthode nouvelle (1795), which was commissioned as a textbook for primary schools and went through multiple editions. He also produced historical and geographical works throughout the Directory and Consulate. Following Napoleon's reorganisation of the Institut in 1803, Mentelle lost his position within the institution.

During the Napoleonic era Mentelle published the multi-volume Géographie mathématique, physique et politique de toutes les parties du monde (1803–1805), prepared with Conrad Malte-Brun. His later works were favourable toward Napoleon and reflected the territorial changes of the French Empire. Mentelle continued to revise and expand his geographical writings in the final years of his life. In 1815 he was awarded the Légion d'Honneur by Louis XVIII. He died in Paris on 29 December 1815. Despite an impressive output, most of his geographical writings were ignored by subsequent generations.

== Selected works ==
- La mort de Polieucte (1751)
- Élémens de géographie (1758)
- Élémens de l'histoire romaine (1766)
- Cosmographie élémentaire (1781)
- Dictionnaire de géographie moderne (1784–1789)
- Géographie ancienne (1787–1793)
- Atlas universel de géographie physique et politique (with Pierre-Gilles Chanlaire, 1797–1798)
- La géographie enseignée par une méthode nouvelle (1795)
- Géographie mathématique, physique et politique de toutes les parties du monde (with Conrad Malte-Brun, 1803–1805)
- Exercices chronologiques (1810)

== Sources ==
- Livingstone, David N.; Withers, Charles W. J. (2005). "Edme Mentelle's Geographies and the French Revolution". Geography and Revolution. University of Chicago Press. doi:10.7208/chicago/9780226487359.003.0010. ISBN 978-0-226-48733-5.
- Runyon, Randolph Paul (2018). The Mentelles: Mary Todd Lincoln, Henry Clay, and the Immigrant Family Who Educated Antebellum Kentucky. University Press of Kentucky. doi:10.2307/j.ctt2111h24.
