= Joseph Lavallée =

French polygraph and man of letters (1747–1816)

Louis-Joseph Lavallée, marquis de Boisrobert, called Joseph Lavallée (French pronunciation: [ʒozɛf lavale]; 23 August 1747, Dieppe – 28 February 1816, London) was an 18th–19th-century French polygraph and man of letters.

== Publications ==
- 1786: Les Bas-reliefs du dix-huitième siècle, with notes, London, Paris, in-8°;
- 1786: Confession de l’année 1785, in-18.
- 1787: Les Adieux du quai de Gèvre à la bonne ville de Paris, in-8°. This work is attributed to Lavallée.
- 1788: Cécile, fille d’Achmet III, empereur des Turcs, née en 1710, Buisson, 2 vol. in-12; Ce roman a connu plusieurs éditions.
- 1789: Discours d’un philosophe à la Nation française, la veille de l’ouverture des États-Généraux, ou le Ralliement des trois ordres, in-8°, 42 pages
- Le nègre comme il y a peu de blancs, Madras et Paris, Buisson, 3 vol. in-12, ou 3 vol. in-18; Ce roman plein de talent et d’intentions philanthropiques est l’œuvre qui a laissé le nom de Lavallée à la postérité.
- 1790: Le Serment civique, ou les Lorrains patriotes, one-act play, Nancy, F. Bachot, in-8°.
- 1790: Les Dangers de l’intrigue, in-12;
- 1791: Tableau philosophique du règne de Louis XIV, ou Louis XIV jugé par un Français libre, Strasbourg, Am. Kœnig, in-8°;
- 1791: La Vérité rendue aux lettres par la liberté; ou de l’importance de l’amour de la vérité dans l’homme de lettres, Strasbourg, Am. Kœnig, in-8°, 335 pages;
- 1792: Voyage dans les départements de la France, par une société d’artistes et de gens de lettres, enrichi de tableaux géographiques et d’estampes : Département de la Seine-Inférieure; Paris, Brion, in-8° de 32 pages, with maps and pl. — De l’Eure; Paris, le même, 1793, in-8°, 40 p. — Du Calvados; Paris, id., 1792, in-8°, 44 pages — De l’Orne; Paris, id., 1793, in-8°, 44 pages — De la Manche; Paris, id., 1793, in-8°, 36 pages, Paris, Brion, 1792-1800, 13 vol. in-8°. This book, of which Laallée drafted the text, L. Brion the drawing part and L. Brion père the geographical part, was written in haste and published in booklets, most of which appeared in 1793 and 1794. They contain several factual errors, and were noticed by the spirit of exaggeration that recall the revolutionary era when they were written.
- 1793: Le Départ des volontaires villageois pour les frontières, comedy in one act, Lille, Deperne, in-18.
- An II: Manlius Torquatus, ou la Discipline romaine, tragedy in verse in 3 acts staged on the Théâtre des arts in 1795, Paris, [s.n.], in-8°;
- 1797: Semaines critiques, ou les Gestes de l’an V, 33 issus in-8°.
- An VI Les Dangers de l’intrigue, roman nouveau, Paris, Lavillette et comp., 4 vol. in-12.
- 1798: Poème sur les tableaux d’Italie, in-8°.
- An VII: Éloge de Wailly, architecte, Paris, Dubray, in-8°. This eulogy was read to the Société philotechnique.
- 1800: Éloge du général Joubert, in-8°. This eulogy was read to the Société philotechnique.
- 1802: Voyage historique et pittoresque de l’Istrie et de la Dalmatie, written according to the route of Louis-François Cassas, grand in-fol.; This book is a good execution; copies in vellum were printed.
- 1803: Lettres d’un Mameluck, Paris, Capelle, in-8°; They incur, said Chénier, the reproach to dare recall the forms of an inimitable masterpiece by Montesquieu; but the Mameluke Giesid not least shows much gaiety, meaning and spirit." (Tableau de la littérature française)
- 1803: Poème épique sur les exploits de N. Bonaparte, translated from modern Greek.
- 1804: Voyages au Cap Nord, by Giuseppe Acerbi, translation with Petit-Radel, 3 vol. in-8°;
- 1805: Annuaire de la Légion d’honneur pour l’an XIII, with Pérotte, in-8°.
- 1806: Grand Rapport fait à M. Pitt par le Marsouin sur son voyage à Paris, Paris, br. in-8°.
- 1807: Annales nécrologiques de la Légion d’honneur, ou Notices sur la vie, les actions d’éclat, les services militaires et administratifs, les travaux scientifiques et littéraires des membres delà Légion d’honneur décédés depuis l’origine de cette institution; dédiées à S. M. l’Empereur, etc., drawn from authentic memoirs. Paris, F. Buisson, in-8° with 15 portraits; This work should be continued for a year, but this volume only appeared which was reproduced in 1811.
- 1809: Histoire des inquisitions religieuses d’Italie, d’Espagne et de Portugal, depuis leur origine, Paris, Cappelle et Renand, 2 vol. in-8° with 6 engravings, fig. This book is nothing more than a compilation drawn from the works of Benoît-Joseph Marsollier, Charles Dellon, etc.
- 1814: Ode lue le 12 janvier 1814 au banquet de la loge maçonnique de la Trinité, Paris, P. Didot ainé, in-4°, 4 pages
- 1815: La Nature et les Sociétés, ou Ariane et Gualther, Paris, Cogez, 4 vol. in-12. Work reprinted the following year under the title l’Orpheline abandonnée dans l’ile déserte, ou la Nature et les Sociétés, Paris, Corbet.
- Éloge de Lemierre, poète. This eulogy was read to the Société philotechnique.
- Éloge historique du général Desaix, tué à la bataille de Marengo; Read at the public session of the philotechnique, 20 fructidor an vue. Paris, de l’imp. des sciences et arts, vend., an IX, in-8°, 53 pages
- Éloge historique du général Marceau, mort de ses blessures à 27 ans, à Altenkirchen, le cinquième jour complémentaire de l’an IV, Paris, de l’impr. des amis réunis, an VI (1797), in-8°, 52 pages. First volume of the « Galerie des hommes illustres » (1796, in-4°) contains three other eulogies by Lavallée, of Léon X, François 1er and Peter the Great.
- 1816: Histoire de l’origine, des progrès et de la décadence des diverses factions révolutionnaires qui ont agité la France depuis 1789 jusqu’à la seconde abdication de Napoléon, London, Murray, 3 vol. in-8°. Posthumous book.
- Galerie du musée Napoléon in 10 volumes published by Antoine-Michel Filhol; vol.1 Text; vol.2 Text; vol.3 Text; vol.4 Text; vol.5 Text; vol.6 Text; vol.7 Text; vol.8 Text; vol.9 Text; vol.10 Text, Paris, Imp. Gillé fils, 1804-1809.

== Sources ==
- Joseph François Michaud, Louis Gabriel Michaud, Biographie universelle, ancienne et moderne, vol.42, Paris, Michaud frères, 1854, (p. 493–4) Biographie universelle, ancienne et moderne.
- Joseph-Marie Quérard, La France littéraire : ou Dictionnaire bibliographique des savants, historiens et gens de lettres de la France, ainsi que des littérateurs étrangers qui ont écrit en français, plus particulièrement pendant les XVIIIe et XIXe, vol.4, Firmin Didot, 1827, 646 pages, (p. 630–2).
- Alphonse Rabbe, Claude-Augustin Vieilh de Boisjolin, Biographie universelle et portative des contemporains, t. iii, Paris, Chez l’éditeur, 1836, (p. 191).
