= Louis Brion de la Tour =

French geographer and demographer

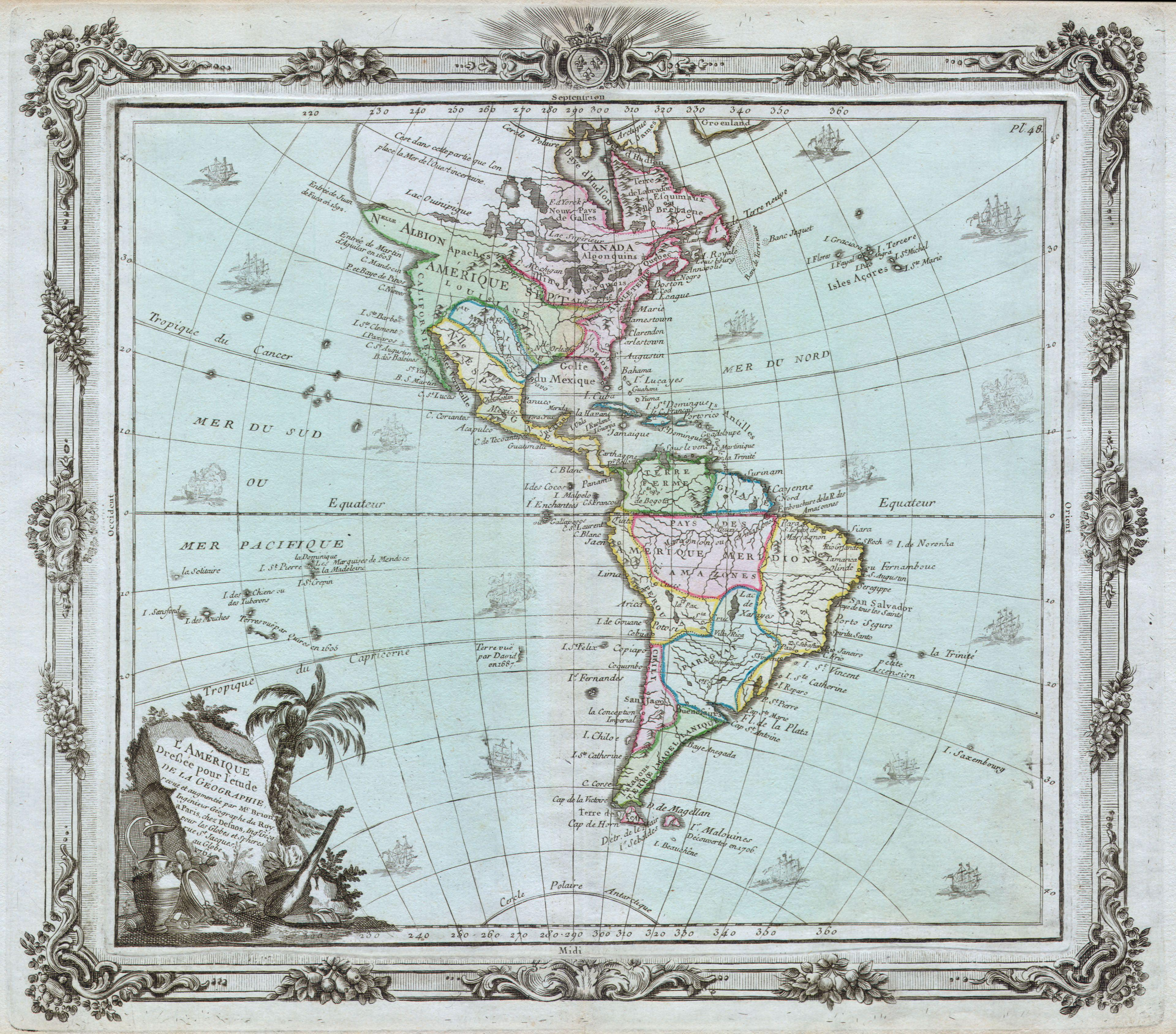
Cartes des Amériques, 1764.

Louis Brion de la Tour, (circa 1743 – 1803) was an 18th-century French geographer and demographer.

== Biography ==
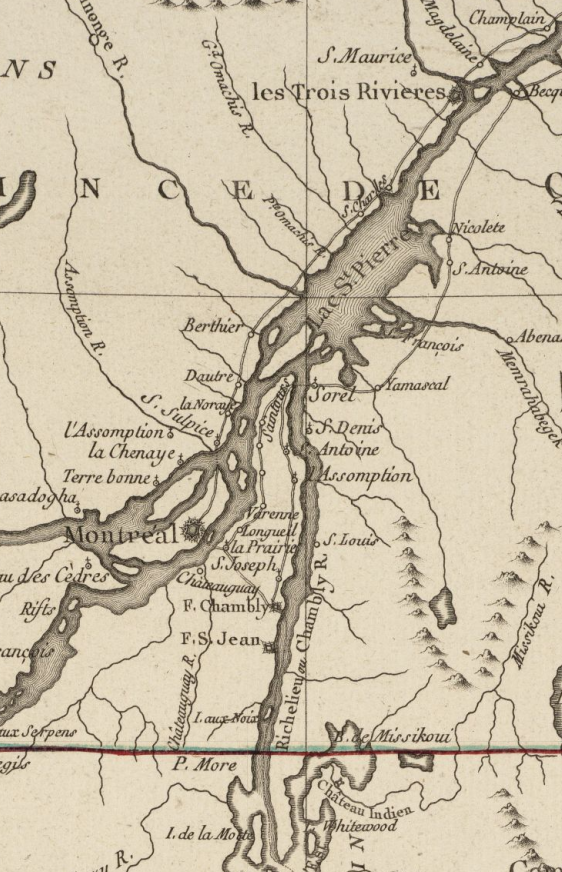
Vallée Richelieu, Monréal, Trois Rivières, by Louis Brion de la Tour, 1777.

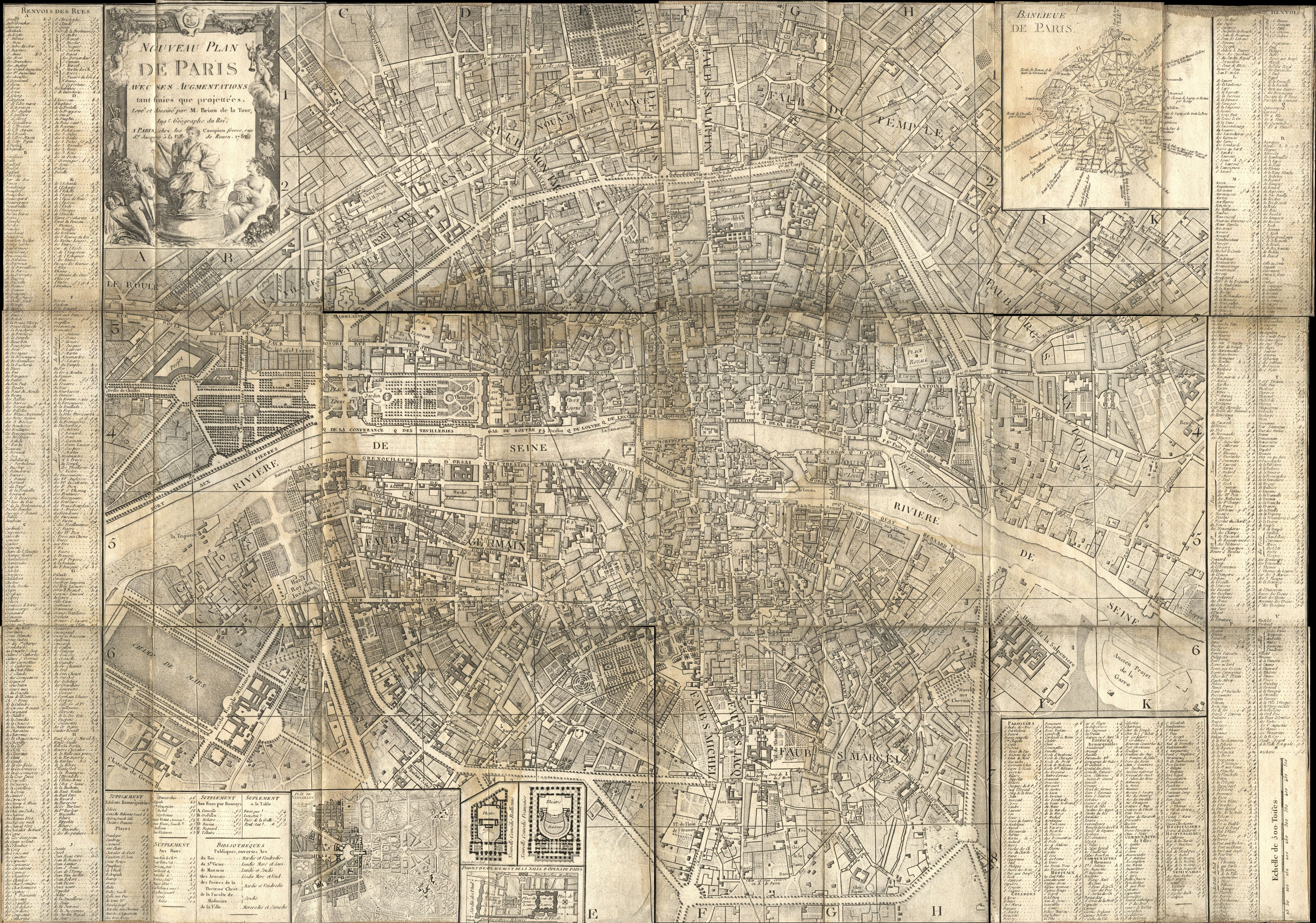
Map of Paris, by Louis Brion de la Tour, 1787.

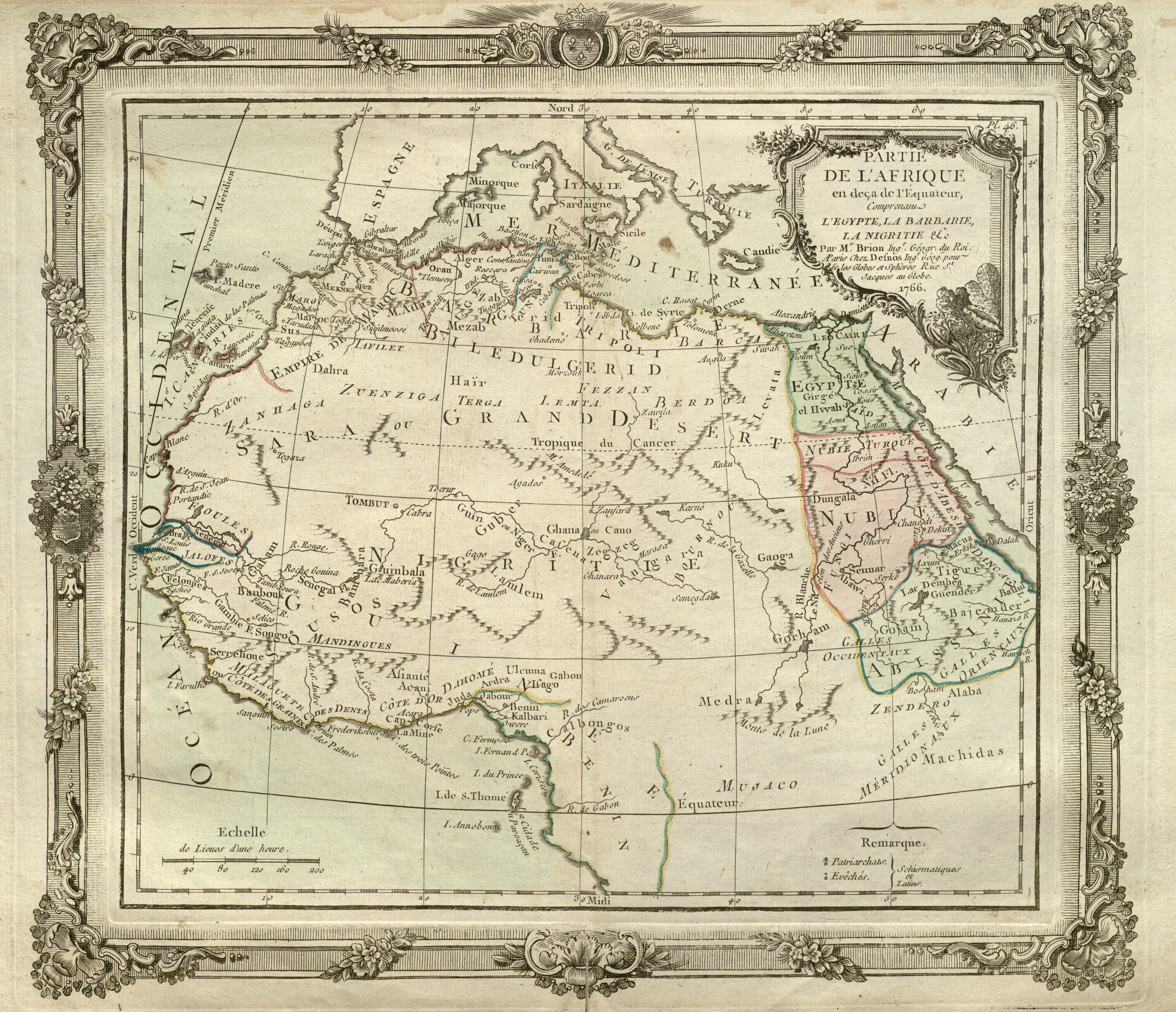
Map of Africa, by Louis Brion de la Tour, 1766.

His family may have come from Bordeaux, having found asylum in Alsace when the Edict of Nantes was revoked by the Edict of Fontainebleau in 1685.

Generally, authors were careful to differentiate him from the engraver Antoine Brion from Reims, born in 1739. He was perhaps his son.

His official title was « Ingénieur Géographe du Roi » ("King's Engineer Geographer"). Although he was a prolific geographer, very little is known of his life or his career. His life passed in scientific work. However what is known is that an important part of his work was done in collaboration with Louis Charles Desnos (circa 1750–1790), bookseller and geographical engineer for globes and spheres of His Danish Majesty. Between 1762 and 1785, he participated in the development of the Indicateur fidèle ou guide des voyageurs, qui enseigne toutes les routes royales.

In 1795, he obtained a pension of the National Assembly.

These cards cost 25 sols (1786)

- His son Louis Brion de la Tour (1763–1823), a student of Jean-Bernard Restout, was a map and Revolution documents engraver, and was also an occasional portraitist of oil paintings. It is often difficult to attribute what is the work of the father or the son. 29 pluviôse an II (27 February 1794), the Journal de la Montagne announced a picture engraved by Brion, representing the assassination of Marat. Brion de la Tour son was the author of portraits of Louis XVI and Marie-Antoinette and the series of the necklace.

== Publications ==
- 1765: Tableau périodique du monde ou Géographie raisonnée et critique.
- 1766: Atlas général, civil et ecclésiastique.
- 1766: Errata de l'Atlas moderne, ou Appel au public de l'accusation de plagiat intentée par le Sieur (Lattré) contre M. Brion, ingénieur-géographe du Roi (par L. Brion de la Tour).
- 1767: La France considérée sous tous les principaux points de vue qui forment le tableau géographique et politique de ce royaume, in-fol.
- 1771: Le Journal du monde ou Géographie historique.
- Plan de Paris (1783,1784,1785, 1787) fait grâce aux relevés fait par Edme Verniquet pour son grand Atlas de Paris.
- undated (1786?) Almanach intéressant dans les circonstances présentes; description abrégée des États-Unis de l'Amérique, des possessions Anglaises, et des pays qui y son contigus, dans les Indes Orientales.
- 1788: Du partage de la peau de l'ours ou Lettres à l'auteur du Rêve politique sur le partage de F Empire ottoman et à l’auteur des considérations sur la guerre actuelle des Turcs par M. B. D. T. Belgrade et Paris.
- 1789: Tableau de la population de la France.
- 1789: Coup d'œil général sur la France.
- 1790: Résultats par approximation des nombreuses recherches de la population des généralités de la France et des villes principales.
- 1792: Voyage dans les départements de la France Voyage, text written by Joseph Lavallée and drawings by L. Brion fils.
- 1795: Description générale de l'Europe, de l'Asie, de l'Afrique et de l'Amérique.
- 1796: Description géographique de l'empire d'Allemagne, son état dans le moyen âge et l'âge moderne, avec 12 cartes.
- 1800: Mappemonde philosophique et politique.
- 1802: Voyage dans la ci-devant Belgique et sur la rive gauche du Rhin... par J.-B.-J. Breton, pour la partie du texte, Louis Brion, pour la partie du dessin, et Louis Brion père, pour la partie géographique..
- 1803: Atlas géographique et statistique de la France divisée en 108 départements.
- 1803: Voyage en Piémont, contenant la description topographique et pittoresque, la statistique et l'histoire des six départements réunis à la France par le sénatus-consulte de l'an XI.
- 1809: Réplique de L. Brion de La Tour à un libelle anonyme intitulé : Appréciation de sa diatribe (prétendue), c'est-à-dire de ses Observations curieuses et utiles avant et après l'acquisition de l'Atlas historique de M. Le Sage, ou baron de Las Casas, etc.

== See also ==
- Sea of the West
