= Thomas Kitchin =

English engraver and cartographer

Thomas Kitchin (also Kitchen; 1718–1784) was an English engraver and cartographer, who became hydrographer to the king. He was also a writer, who wrote about the history of the West Indies.

== Life ==
He was born in Southwark, and was apprenticed to Emanuel Bowen in 1732. Originally based in Clerkenwell, by late 1755 Kitchin was established on Holborn Hill. From 1773 Kitchin was royal hydrographer to the king. He married Sarah Bowen, daughter of Emanuel, in 1739, and then Jane, daughter of Joseph Burroughs, in 1762. He died in St Albans on 23 June 1784. Kitchin lived and worked in London until his retirement.

== Works ==
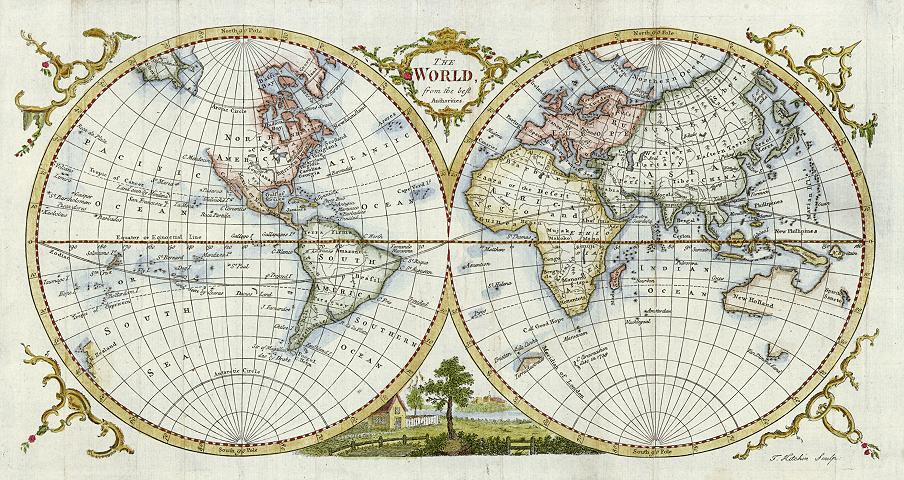
'The World From the Best Authorities' engraved by Thomas Kitchin, published in William Guthrie's New Geographical Grammar, 1777.

He produced John Elphinstone's map of Scotland (1746), Geographia Scotiae (1749), and The Small English Atlas (1749) with Thomas Jefferys. The Large English Atlas (with Bowen 1749–60) was a serious attempt to cover England at large scale. In 1755 Kitchin engraved the Mitchell Map of North America. He worked for London Magazine. He produced 170 maps for London Magazine (1747–83). Kitchin was the head hydrographer for the King of England. Kitchin frequently copied the works of other cartographers, greatly expanding the catalog of his work as a cartographer.

Map of Middlesex, 1769.

His book, The Present State of the West-Indies: Containing an Accurate Description of What Parts Are Possessed by the Several Powers in Europe was published in 1778 bt R. Baldwin in London.

In 1783, he wrote, The Traveller's Guide Through England and Wales, which listed most towns and cities with mileages back to London.

Kitchin died in June 1784 and was buried in St Alban's Cathedral. His memorial stone has not survived.

== See also ==
- Sea of the West
