= Strait of Anián =

Semi-mythical strait between North America and Asia

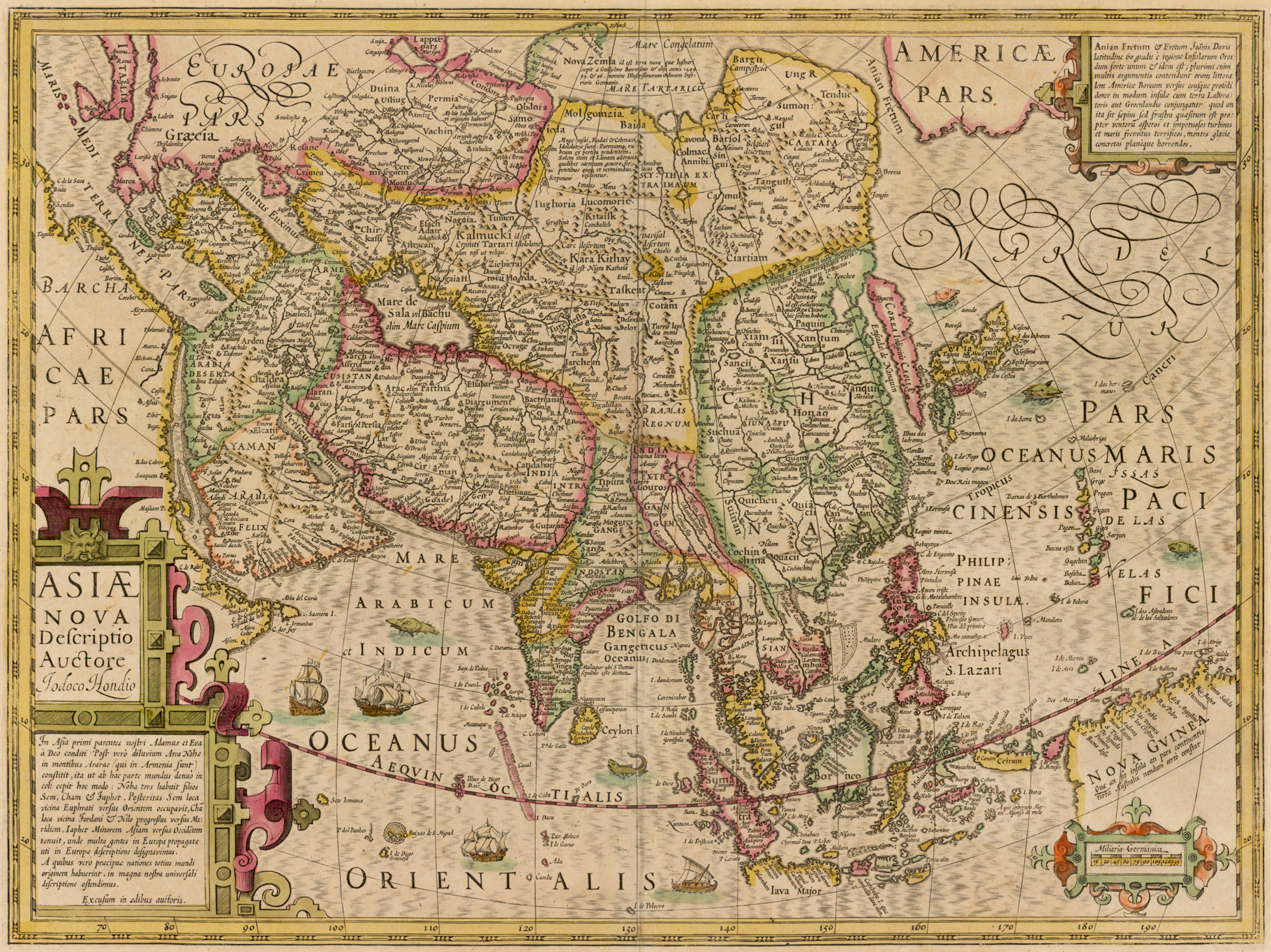
A 1610 map showing the Strait of Anián top right, at the approximate location of the Bering Strait

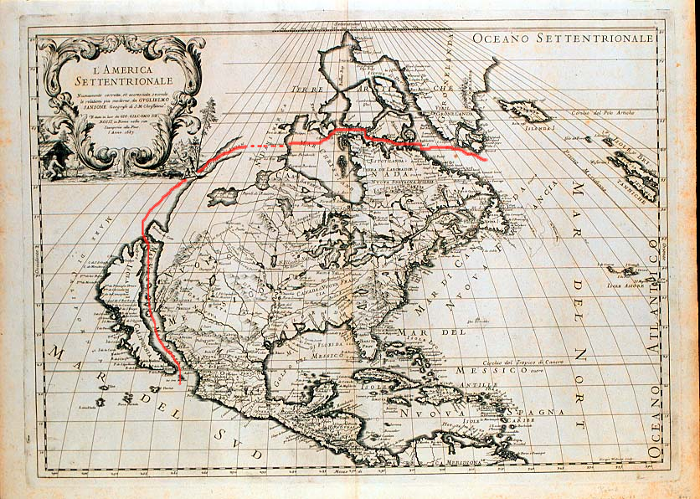
1687 map showing Baja California as an island, with a possible Strait of Anián top left extending east toward Hudson Bay

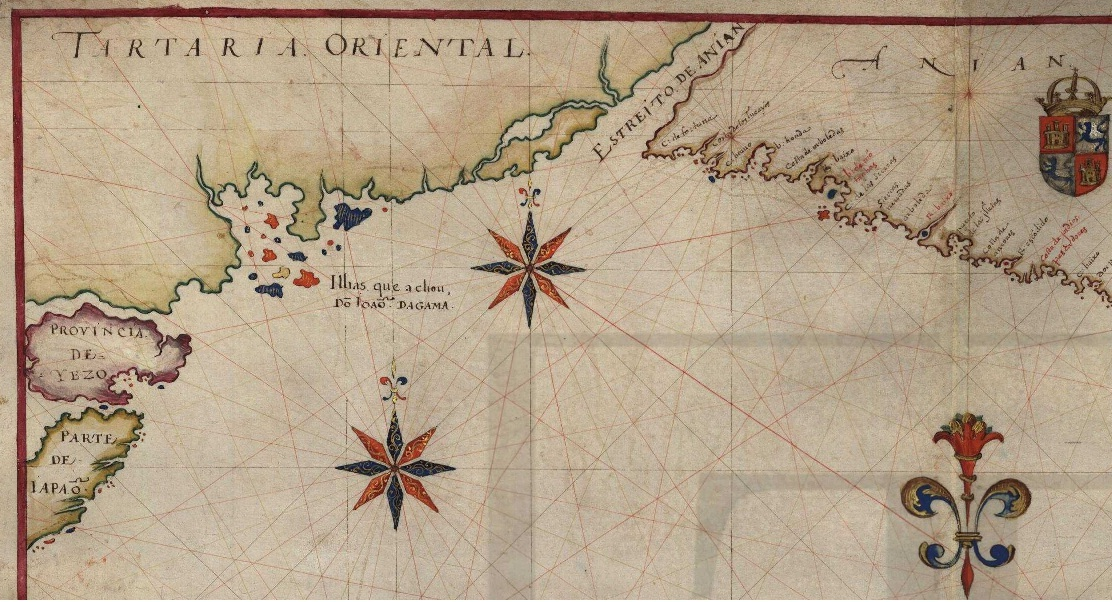
Atlas of João Teixeira Albernaz I, 1643, showing the North Pacific Ocean and the area reached by the navigator João da Gama, including islands João da Gama found (possibly the Kuril Islands) or lands further northeast. The mythical or "recognized" Strait of Anián, separating Asia and the Americas, is also shown at top. Part of the known North American coast is possibly widely shifted to the northwest.

The Strait of Anián was a semi-mythical strait, documented from around 1560, that was believed by early modern cartographers to mark the boundary between North America and Asia and to permit access to a Northwest Passage from the Arctic Ocean to the Pacific. The true strait was discovered in 1728 and became known as the Bering Strait. The Strait of Anián had been generally placed nearby, but sometimes appeared as far south as California.

== History ==
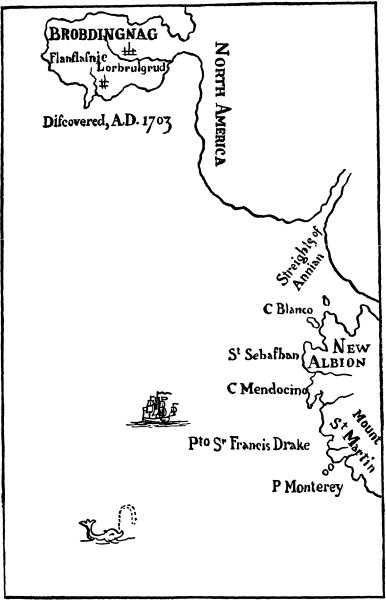
Map of Brobdingnag; the Strait of Anián can be seen at centre right.

The source of this idea is unknown. The Martin Waldseemüller map of 1506 or 1507 shows America and Asia separated. A 1562 map by Paolo Forlani shows Asia and North America joined north of about the latitude of San Diego. The strait probably took its name from Ania, a Chinese province mentioned in a 1559 edition of Marco Polo's book. The name probably first appeared on a map issued by the Italian cartographer Giacomo Gastaldi in 1562. It appeared on maps by Abraham Ortelius (1564), Bolognini Zaltieri (1567) and Gerardus Mercator (1567). The Zaltieri and Gastaldi maps show it narrow and crooked. Gastaldi and Ortelius have an "Ania" or "Anian" on the east side of the strait. A speculative map of 1578 shows Frobisher Strait extending all the way across Canada and ending at the Strait of Anián. Juan de Fuca, a Greek navigator, sailed in a Spanish expedition in 1592 to seek the fabled Strait of Anián. A 1719 map by Herman Moll shows the strait as a probable bay at 50° North, north of the Island of California. The 1726 edition of a map by Johannes van Keulen shows the strait north of the Island of California with the note that "They say that one can come through this strait to Hudson Bay, but this is not proven."

== Cultural legacy ==
The Strait of Anián can be seen in the map of Brobdingnag featured in Jonathan Swift's classic 1726 novel Gulliver's Travels. Anián is also mentioned (as 'Anyan') in the John Donne poem Hymn to God, My God, in My Sickness among other places such as the Pacific Sea, Jerusalem, and Gibraltar.

The Strait of Anián is mentioned in the prologue of James Clavell's 1975 novel Shōgun as a possible destination for a sailing voyage undertaken by Francis Drake.

== See also ==
- Early knowledge of the Pacific Northwest
- Shangdu (Xanadu)
- Cathay

== Sources ==
- Brooke-Hitching, Edward (2016). The Phantom Atlas: The Greatest Myths, Lies and Blunders on Maps. London: Simon & Schuster UK. ISBN 978-1-4711-5945-9.
- Hayes, Derek (2001). Historical Atlas of the North Pacific Ocean: Maps of Discovery and Scientific Exploration, 1500-2000. Published under the auspices of North Pacific Marine Science Organization [by] Sasquatch Books. ISBN 978-1-57061-311-1.
