= Philippe Buache =

French geographer (1700–1773)

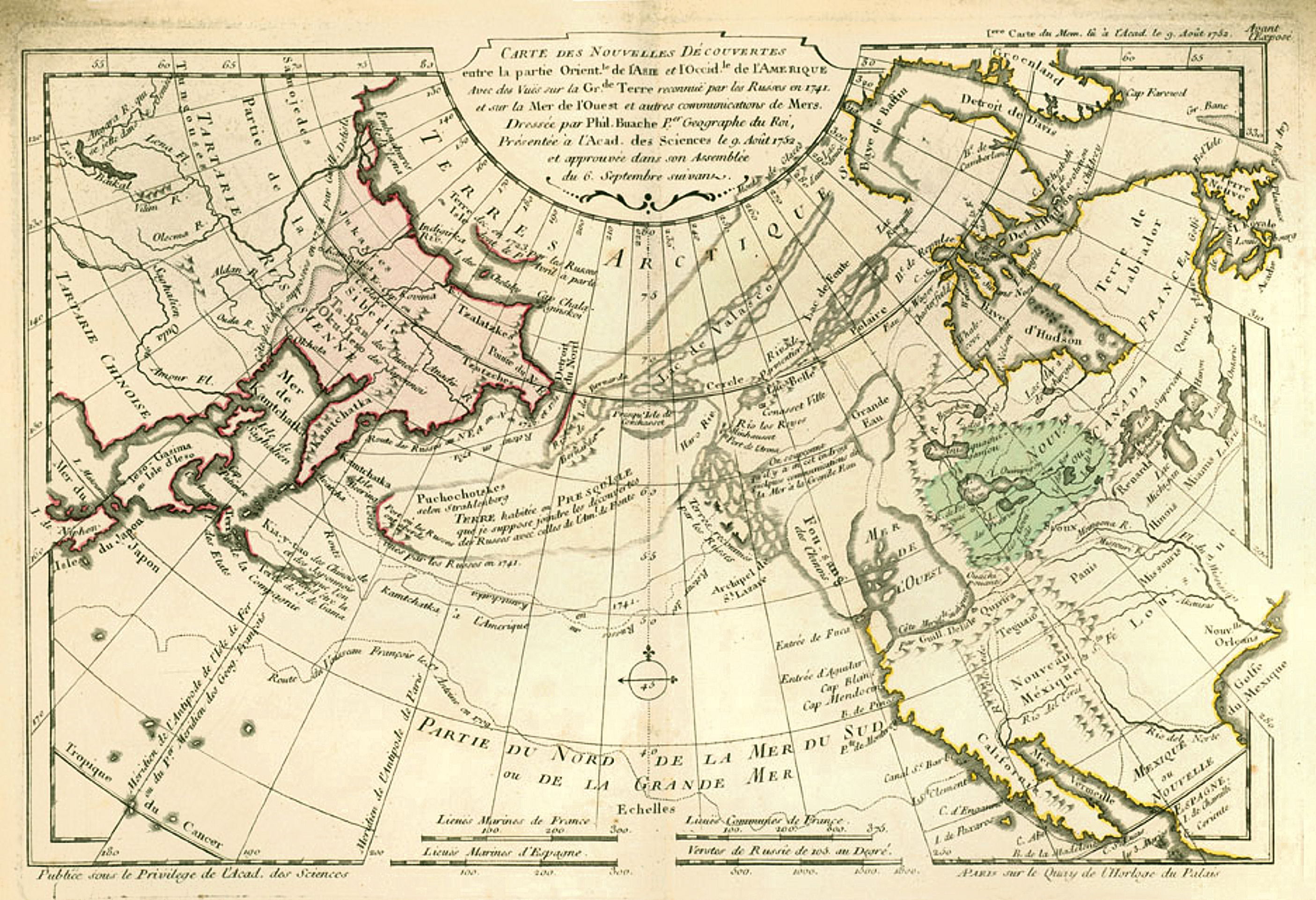
This 1753 map by Philippe Buache locates Fusang ("Fou-Sang des Chinois", "Fusang of the Chinese") north of the State of California.

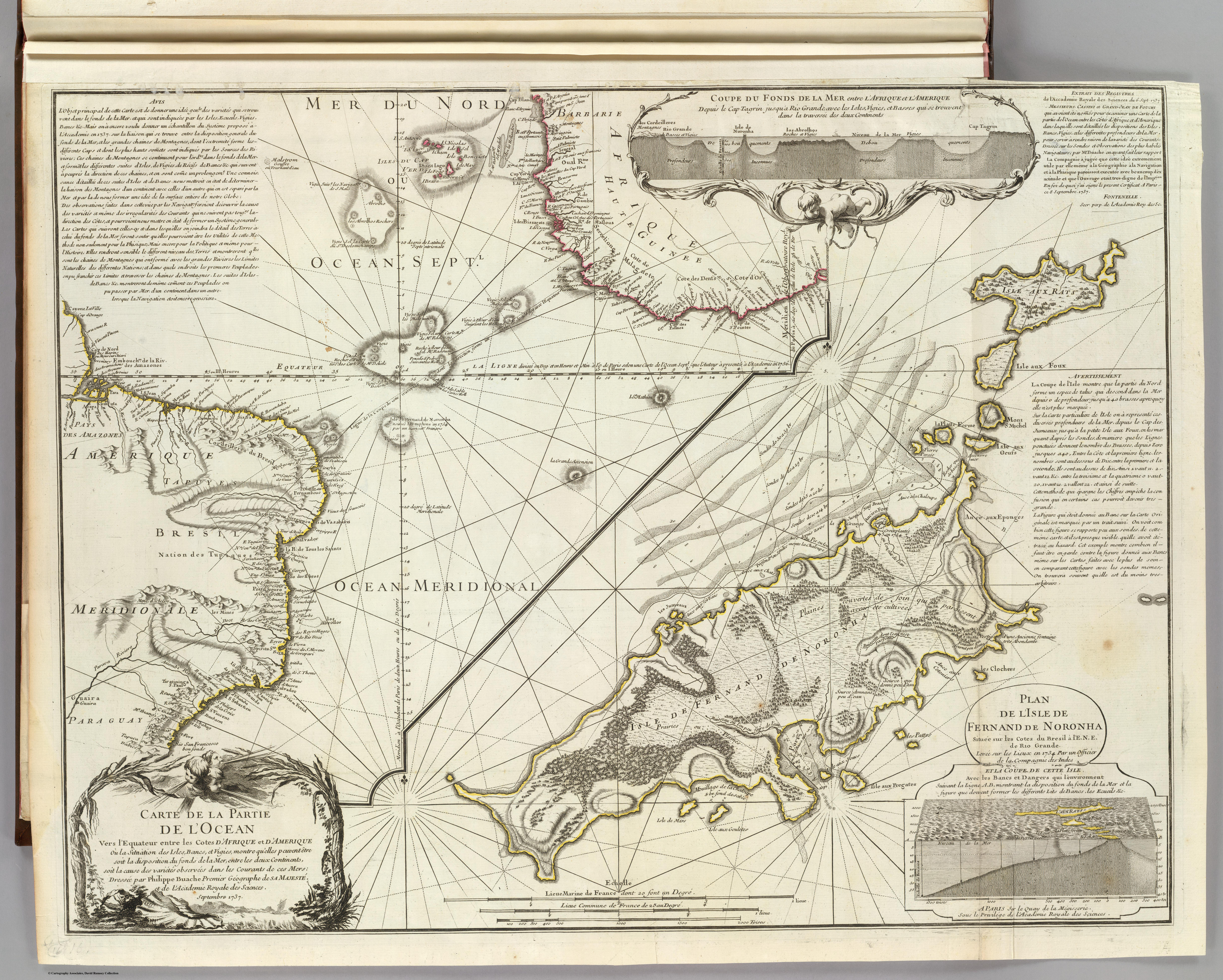
Philippe Buache, Carte d'une partie de l'Océan vers l'Équateur entre les costes d'Afrique et d'Amérique... Paris, 1737. Map engraved on copper (63,5 x 48,3 cm), showing Fernando de Noronha island

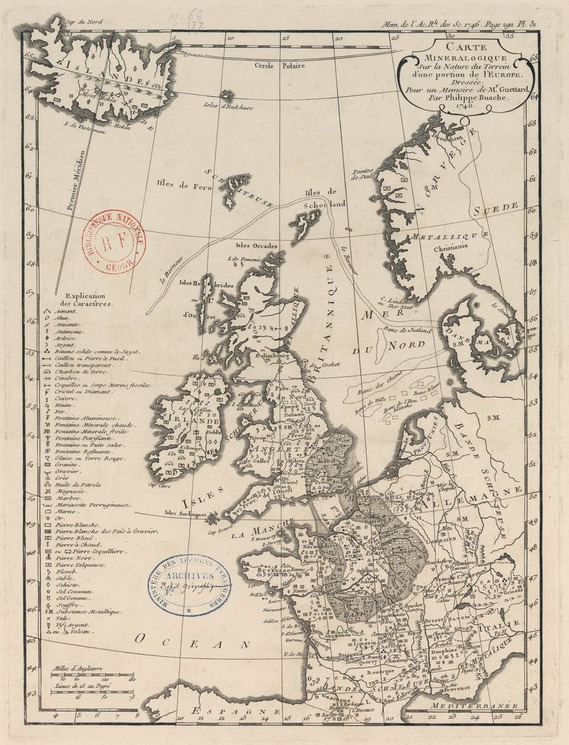
Jean-Étienne Guettard and Philippe Buache, Carte minéralogique sur la nature du terrain d’une portion de l’Europe, possibly the first true geological map.

Philippe Buache (born La Neuville-au-Pont, 7 February 1700; died Paris, 24 January 1773) was a French geographer, known for inventing a new system of geography and popularizing this topic.

== Life and work ==
Buache was trained by the geographer Guillaume Delisle, whose daughter he married, and whom he succeeded in the Académie des sciences in 1730.

Buache was nominated first geographer of the king in 1729. He established a division of the world by seas and river systems. He believed in a southern continent, an hypothesis which was confirmed by later discoveries. In 1754, he published an "Atlas physique." He also wrote several pamphlets.

His nephew, Jean Nicolas Buache (born La Neuville-au-Pont, 15 February 1741; died Paris, 21 November 1825), was also a geographer of the king.

== Works ==
- Considérations géographiques et physiques sur les découvertes nouvelles dans la grande mer (Paris, 1754). This contains a chart of the western coast of North America.
- Le parallèle des fleuves des quatre parties du monde pour servir a déterminer la hauteur des montagnes (1757)
- Mémoire sur la traversée de la mer glaciale arctique (1759). This contains his hypothesis of an Alaskan peninsula.
- Considérations géographiques sur les terres australes et antarctiques (1761)

== See also ==
- Sea of the West
