= Desan =

Desan can refer to:

- Desan (bishop), a Christian bishop in Mesopotamia in the 4th century AD
- Deçan, a town in western Kosovo

== People with the surname ==
- Christine A. Desan, American legal scholar
- Philippe Desan, Montaigne scholar and professor of French and history
- Suzanne Desan, American historian
- Wilfrid Desan, a philosopher specializing in existentialism and phenomenology
