= Abraham Bosse =

French artist (1604–1676)

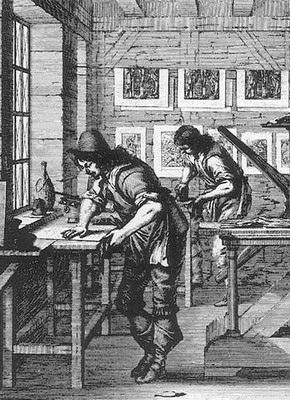
- Born: c. 1604; Tours, France
- Died: 14 February 1676 (aged 71–72); Paris, France
- Occupation: printmaker

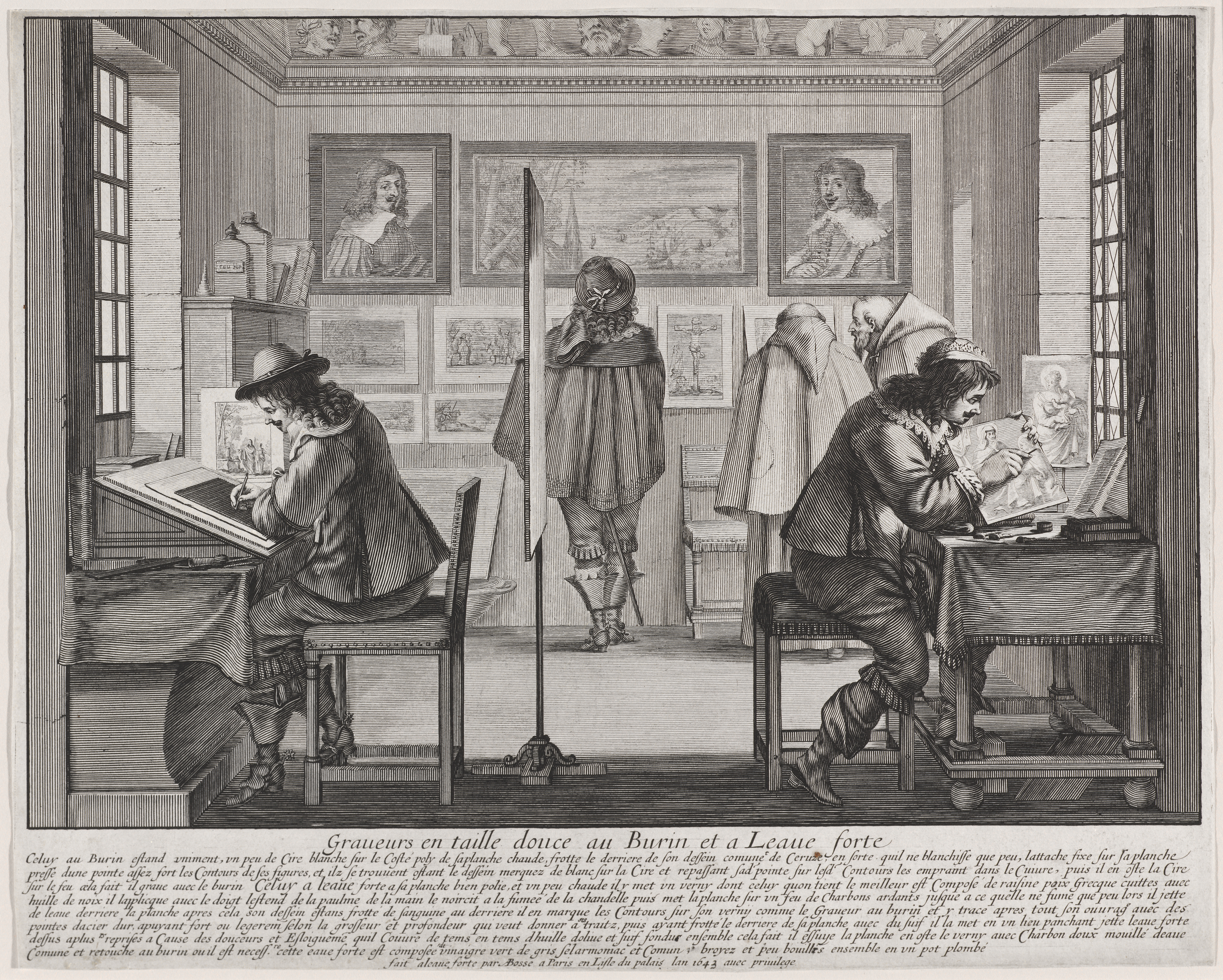
Engravers and etchers at work, 1643

Abraham Bosse (c. 1604 – 14 February 1676) was a French artist, mainly as a printmaker in etching, but also in watercolour.

== Life ==
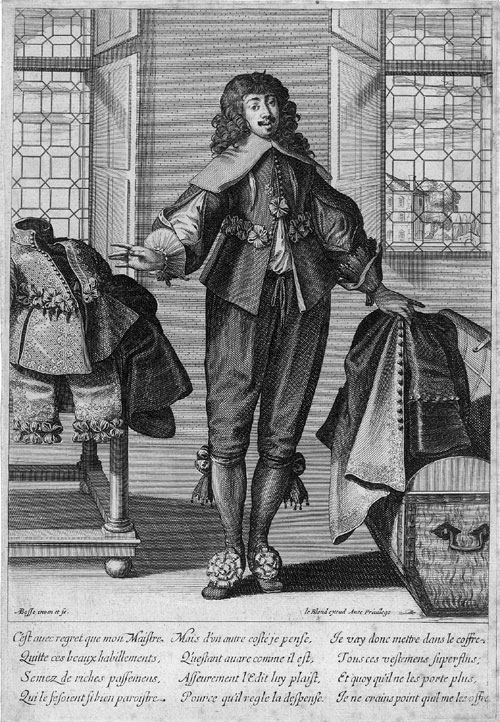
Valet de Chambre from a series of etchings of trades, Les Metiers 1635

He was born to Huguenot (Calvinist) parents in Tours, France, where his father had moved from Germany. His father was a tailor, and Bosse's work always depicted clothes in loving detail. He married Catherine Sarrabat at Tours in 1632. He remained a Huguenot, dying before the Revocation of the Edict of Nantes, but was happy to illustrate religious subjects to Catholic taste.

== Work ==
Roughly 1600 etchings are attributed to him, with subjects including: daily life, religion, literature, fashion, technology, and science. Most of his output was illustrations for books, but many were also sold separately.

His style grows from Dutch and Flemish art, but is given a strongly French flavour. Many of his images give informative detail about middle and upper-class daily life in the period, although they must be treated with care as historical evidence. His combination of very carefully depicted grand interiors with relatively trivial domestic subjects was original and highly influential on French art, and also abroad — William Hogarth's engravings are, among other things, a parody of the style. Most of his images are perhaps best regarded as illustrations rather than art.

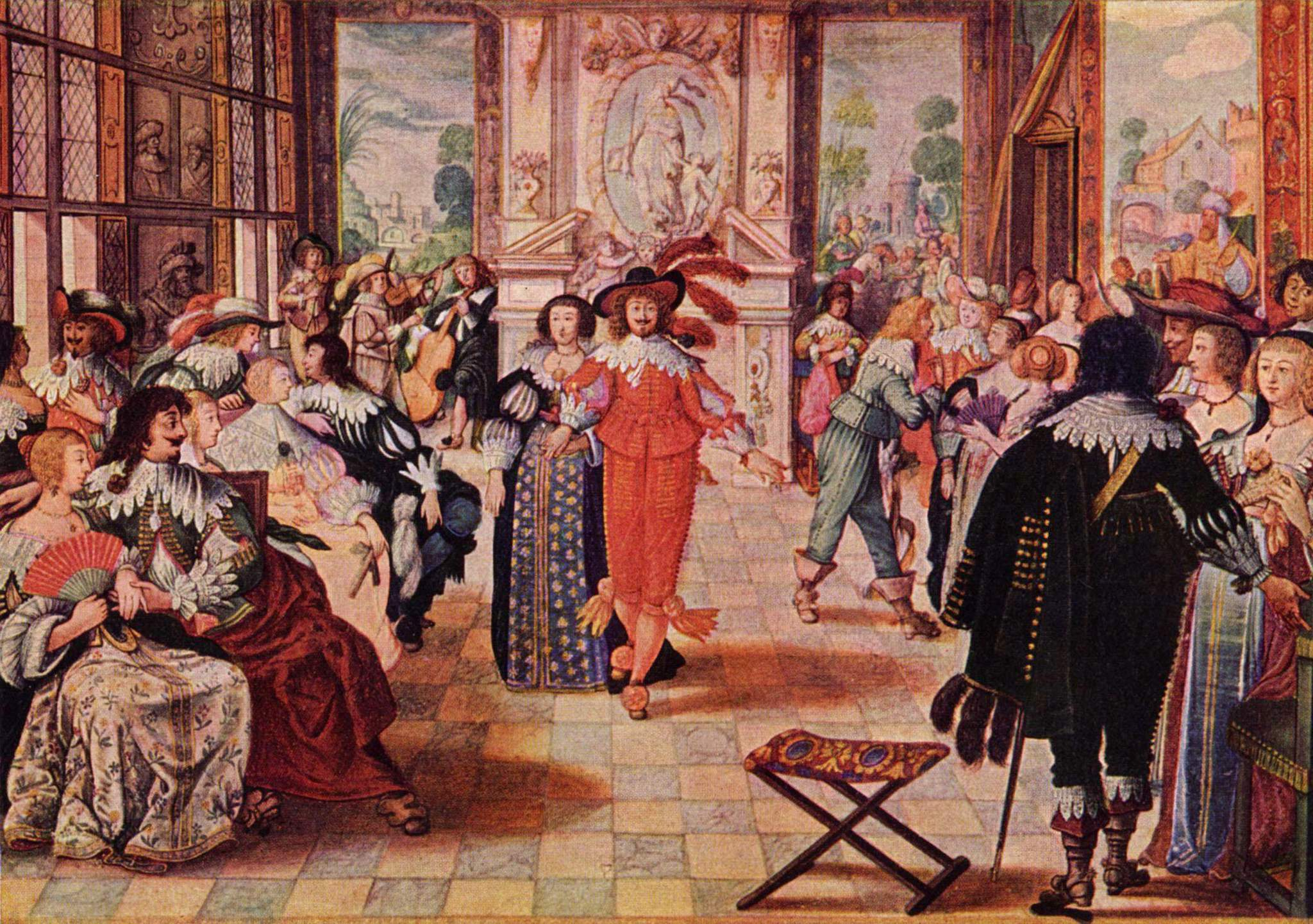
Watercolour of a ball by Abraham Bosse, a similar subject to many of his most famous etchings

He was apprenticed in Paris about 1620 to the Antwerp-born engraver Melchior Tavernier, who was also an important publisher. His first etchings date to 1622, and are influenced by Jacques Bellange. Following a meeting in Paris about 1630, he became a follower of Jacques Callot, whose technical innovations in etching he popularised in the famous and much translated Traité des manières de graver en taille-douce [Treatise on Line Engraving] (1645), the first to be published. He took Callot's highly detailed small images to a larger size, and a wider range of subject matter.

Unlike Callot, his declared aim, in which he largely succeeded, was to make etchings look like engravings, to which end he sacrificed willingly the freedom of the etched line, whilst certainly exploiting to the full the speed of the technique. Like most etchers, he frequently used engraving on a plate in addition to etching, but produced no pure engravings.

== Controversy ==
In 1641, he began to attend classes given by the architect Girard Desargues (1591–1661) on perspective and other technical aspects of depiction. Bosse not only adopted these methods but also published a series of works between 1643–1653 explaining and promoting them.

In 1648, Cardinal Mazarin established the Académie Royale de Peinture et de Sculpture. Bosse was made an honorary member in 1651. However his publicising of Desargues' methods embroiled him in a controversy with Charles Le Brun and his followers, who had different methods, and also a belief that "genius" rather than technical method should be the guide in creating artworks. In 1661 Bosse was forced to withdraw from the Academy; he established his own school as an alternative, but it was suppressed by Le Brun.

== Major works ==
=== Etchings & Images ===
Frontispiece for Hobbes' Leviathan

- Le jardin de la Noblesse françoise — fashion (partly after Jean de St-Igny)(1629)
- Les Cris de Paris (c. 1630) — street cries
- Les gardes françoises (1632)
- Le mariage à la ville, le mariage à la campagne (1633) — bourgeois vs pastoral weddings
- Les métiers (1635?) — The trades
- Plates for L'Ariane (1639)
- Plates for Le Trésor des merveilles de la Maison Royale de Fontainebleau (1642)
- La manière universelle de M. des Argues Lyonnois pour poser l'essieu & placer les heures & autres choses aux cadrans au Soleil (1643), printed by P. de Hayes, Paris
- La pratique du trait à preuve de M. des Argues Lyonnois pour la coupe des pierres en Architecture pratiquer la perspective (1643)
- De la manière de graver à l'eaux-forte et au burin (1645)
- Traité des manières de graver en taille douce sur l'airin par le moyen des eaux-fortes... (1645) The "Manual of Etching".
- Manière universelle de M. des Argues pour pratiquer la perspective par petit-pied comme le géométral... (1648) — Manual on perspective
- Moyen universel de pratiquer la perspective sur les tableaux ou surfaces irrégulières... (1653)
- The famous frontispiece for Leviathan by Thomas Hobbes (1651) was created with input from Hobbes.
- Plates for La Pucelle ou la France délivrée (1656)
- Des ordres des colonnes (1664) — Architecture
- Traité des pratiques géométrales et de perspective (1665)

=== Later Collections ===
- Die Kunst, in Kupfer zu stechen, Ilmer, Osnabrück 1975 (Repr. d. Ausg. Nürnberg 1765)
- Radier-Büchlein. Handelt von der Etzkunst, nemlich wie man mit Scheidwasser in Kupfer etzen, das Wasser und wie auch den harten und weichen Etzgrund machen solle, Moos, München 1977, ISBN 3-7879-0088-8 (Repr. d. Ausg. Nürnberg 1689)

== Gallery ==
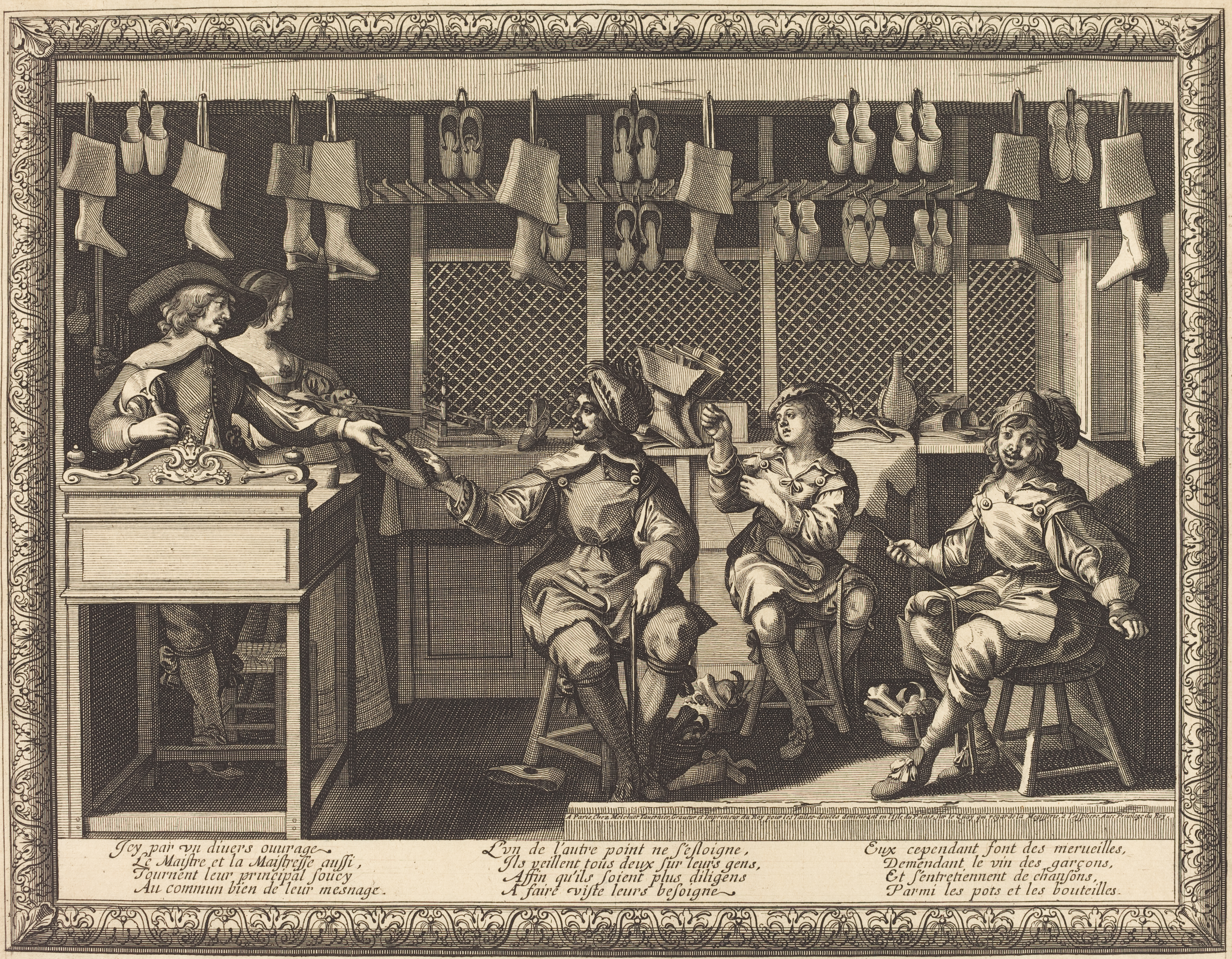
The Shoemakers, etching (National Gallery of Art)

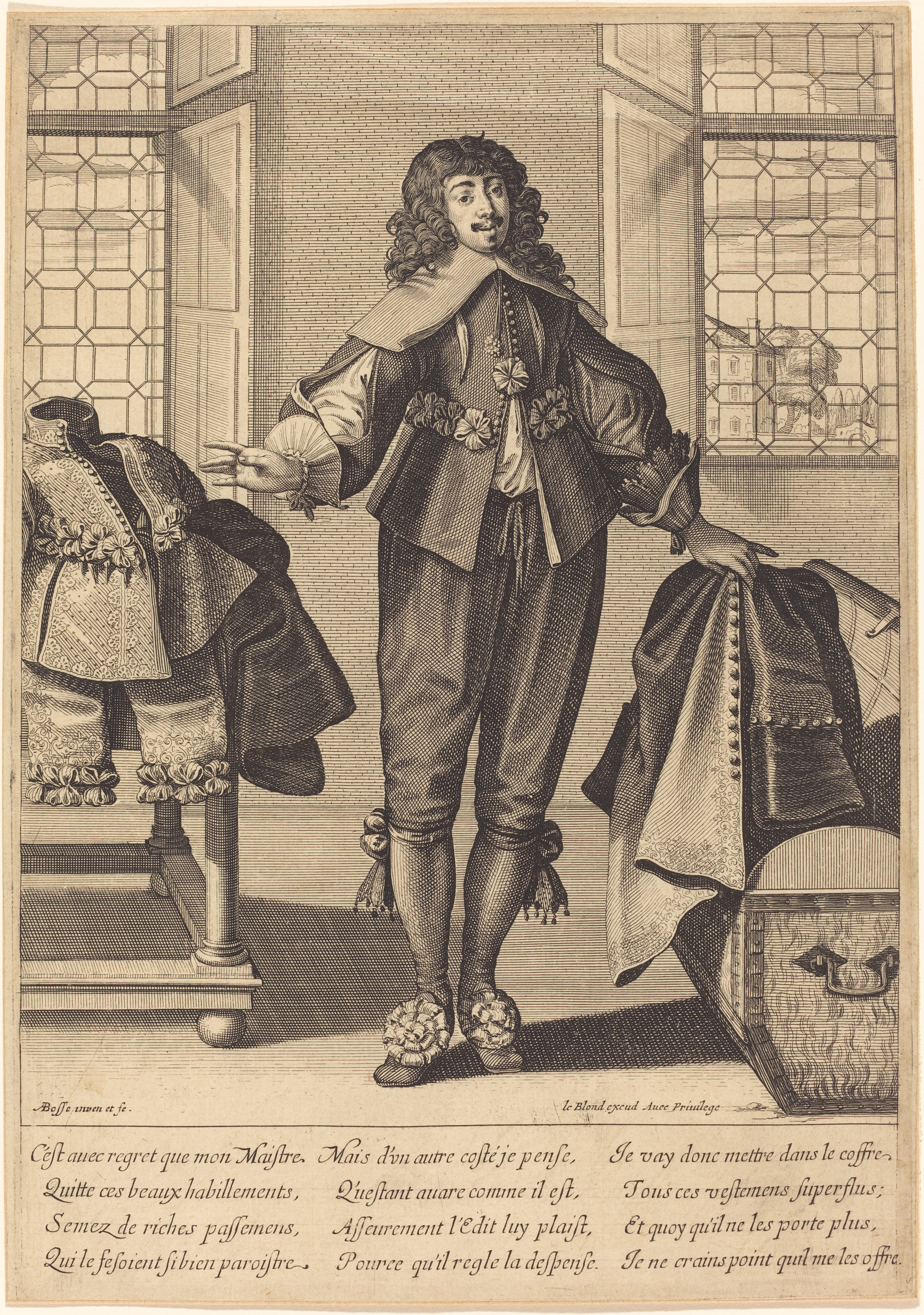
The Valet, engraving in black on laid paper, 29 x 20.4 cm (11 7/16 x 8 1/16 in.), (National Gallery of Art)

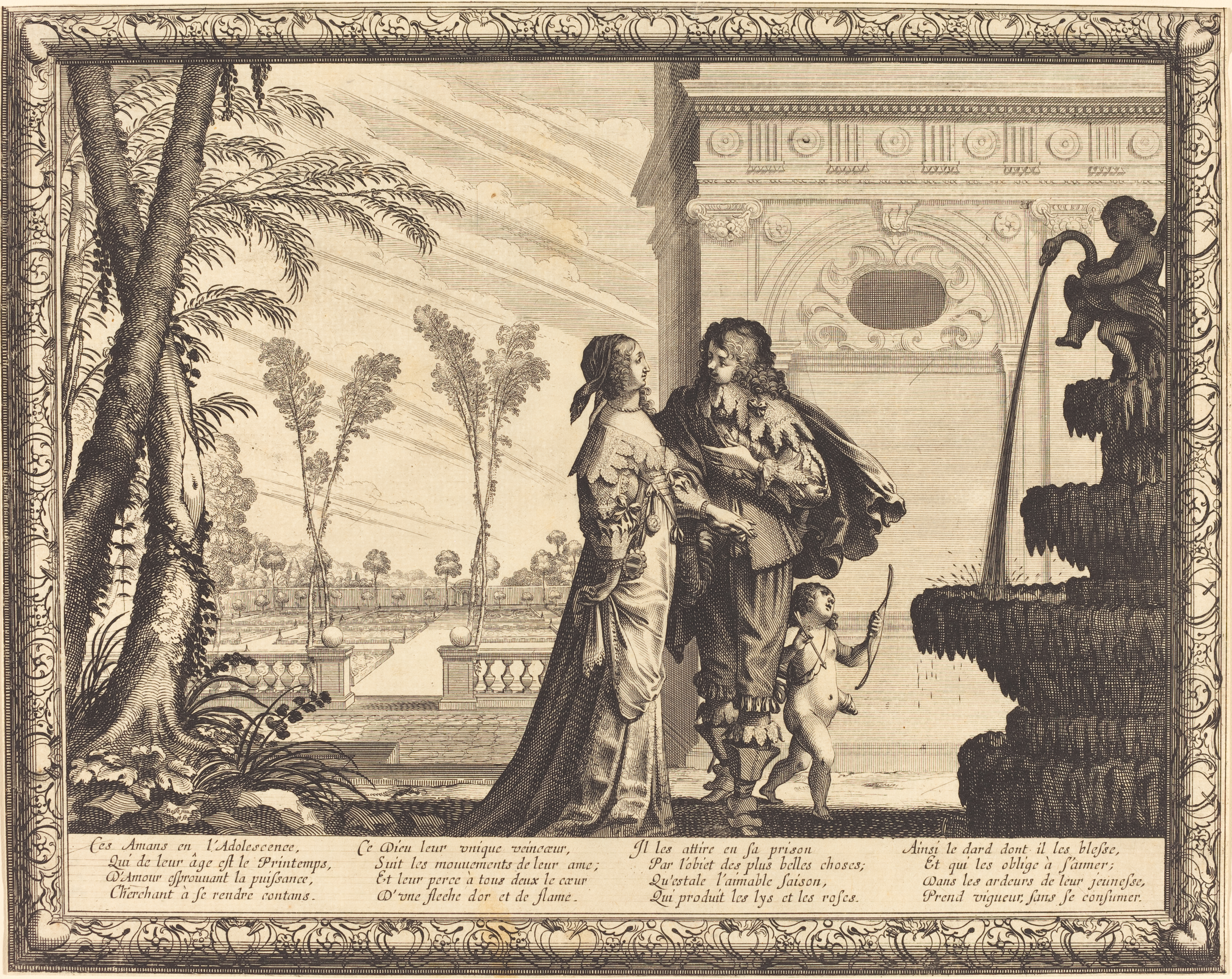
Adolescence, 1636, engraving and etching (National Gallery of Art)

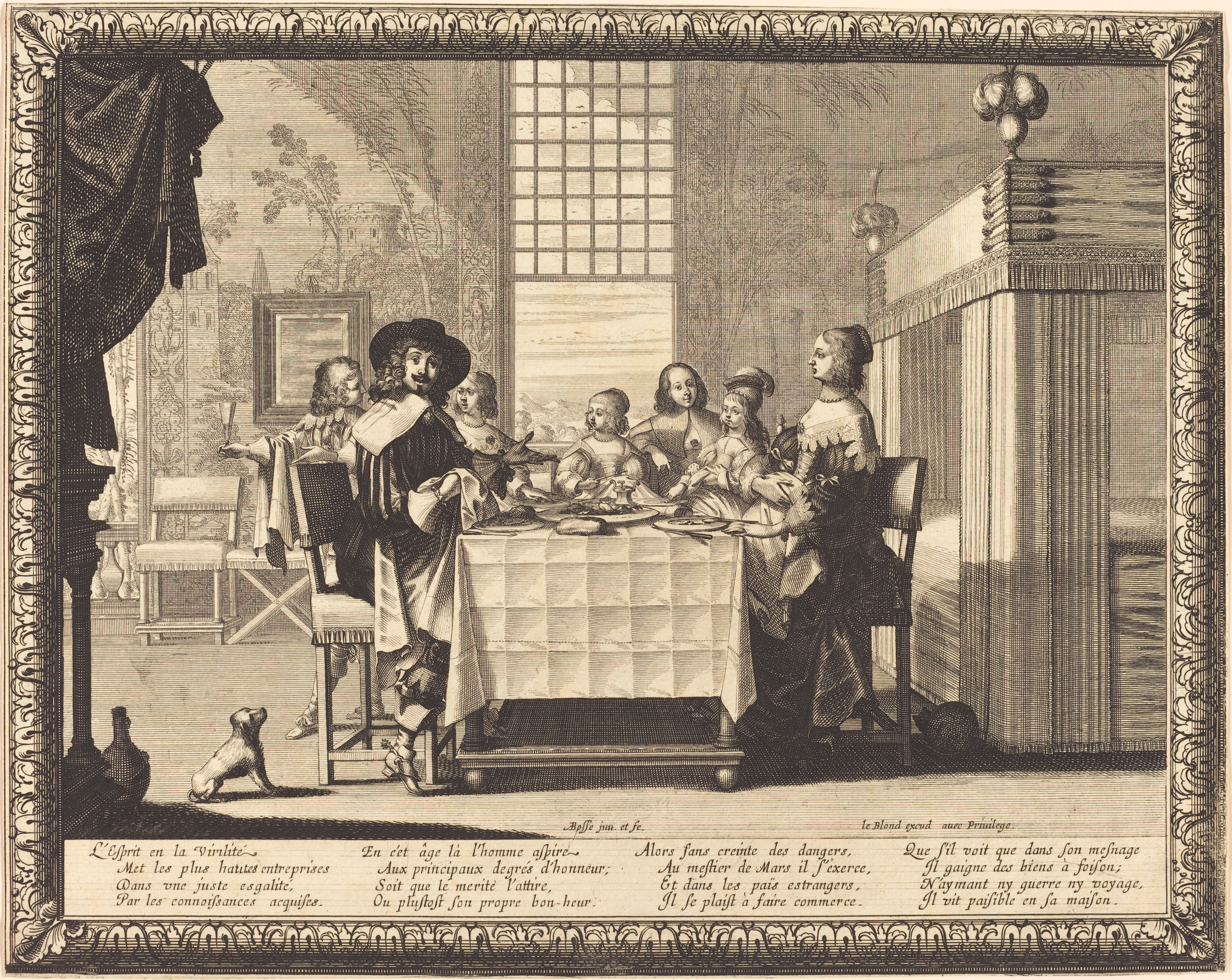
Manhood, 1636, engraving and etching (National Gallery of Art)

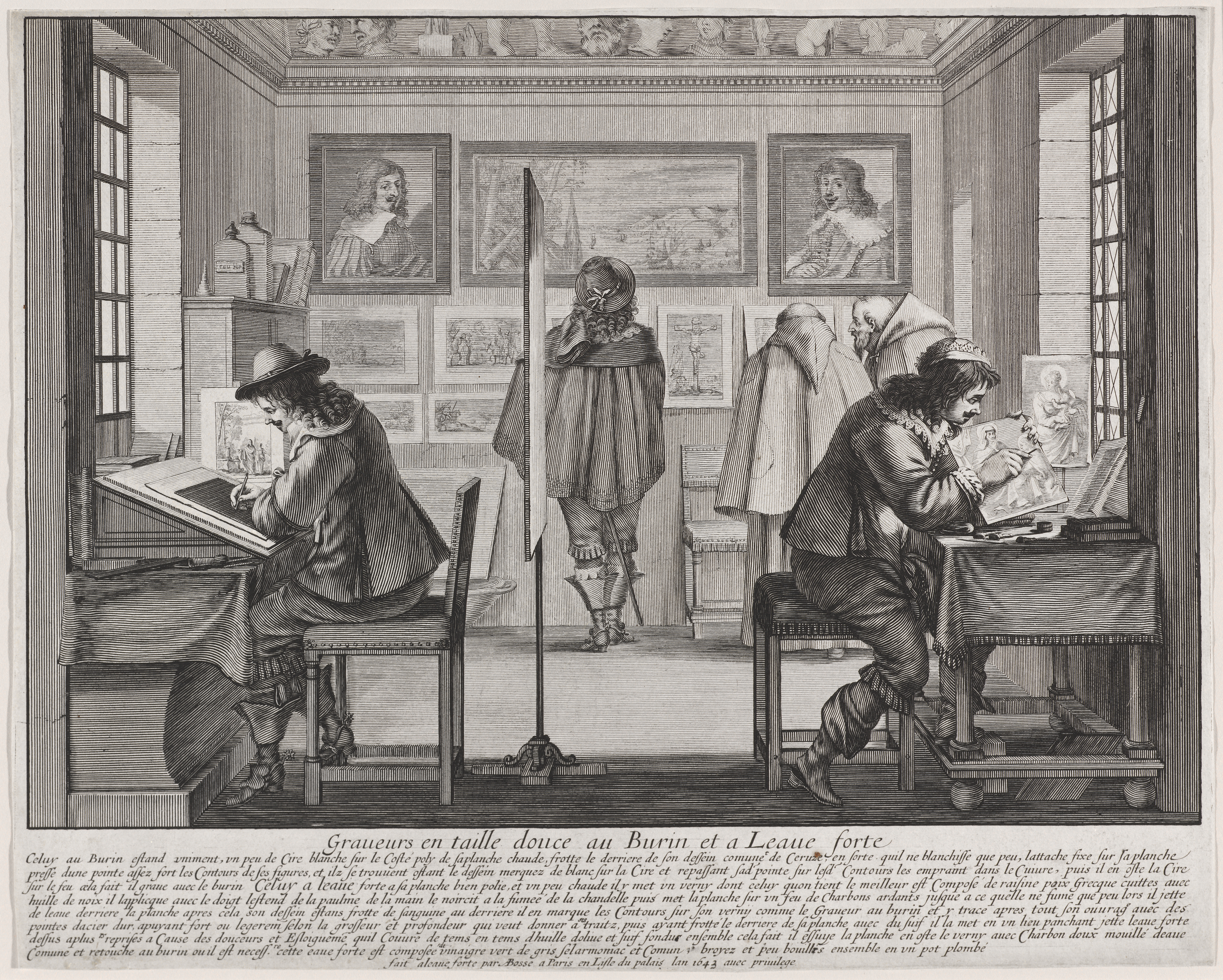
Engravers, 1642, etching (National Gallery of Art)

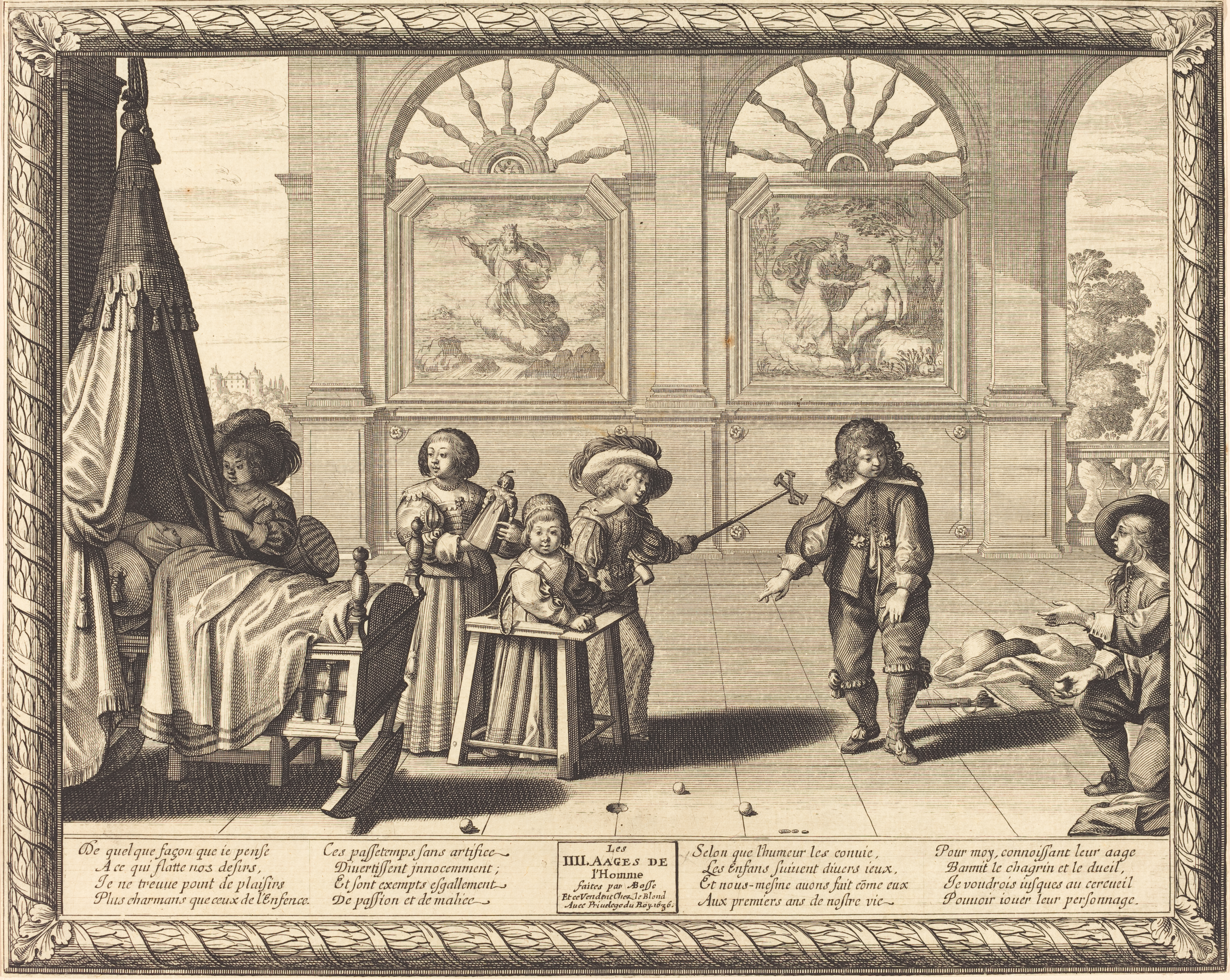
Childhood, 1636, engraving and etching (National Gallery of Art)

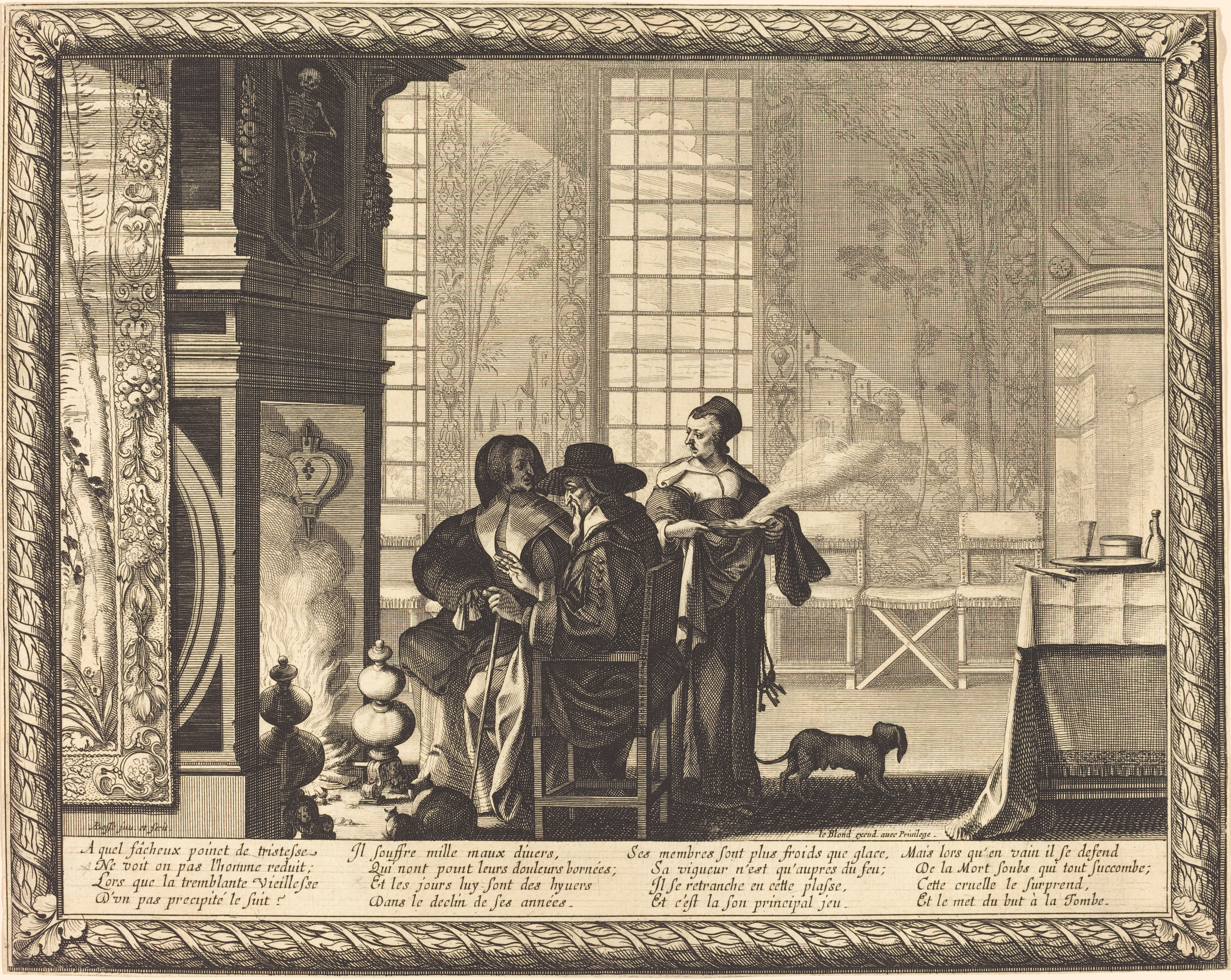
Death, 1636, engraving and etching (National Gallery of Art)

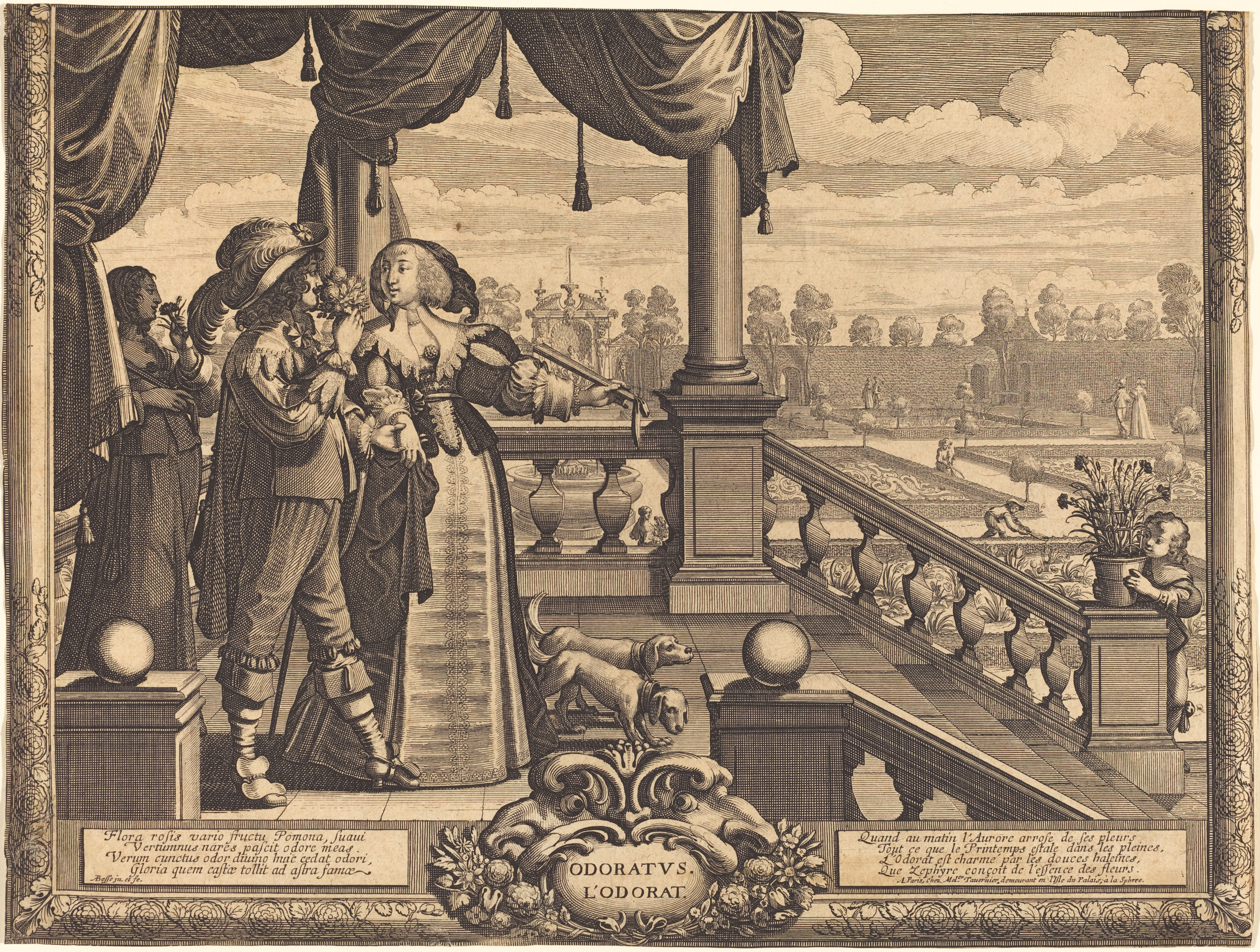
Odoratus, L'Ordorat, engraving in black on laid paper, 24 x 32 cm (9 7/16 x 12 5/8 in.) (National Gallery of Art)

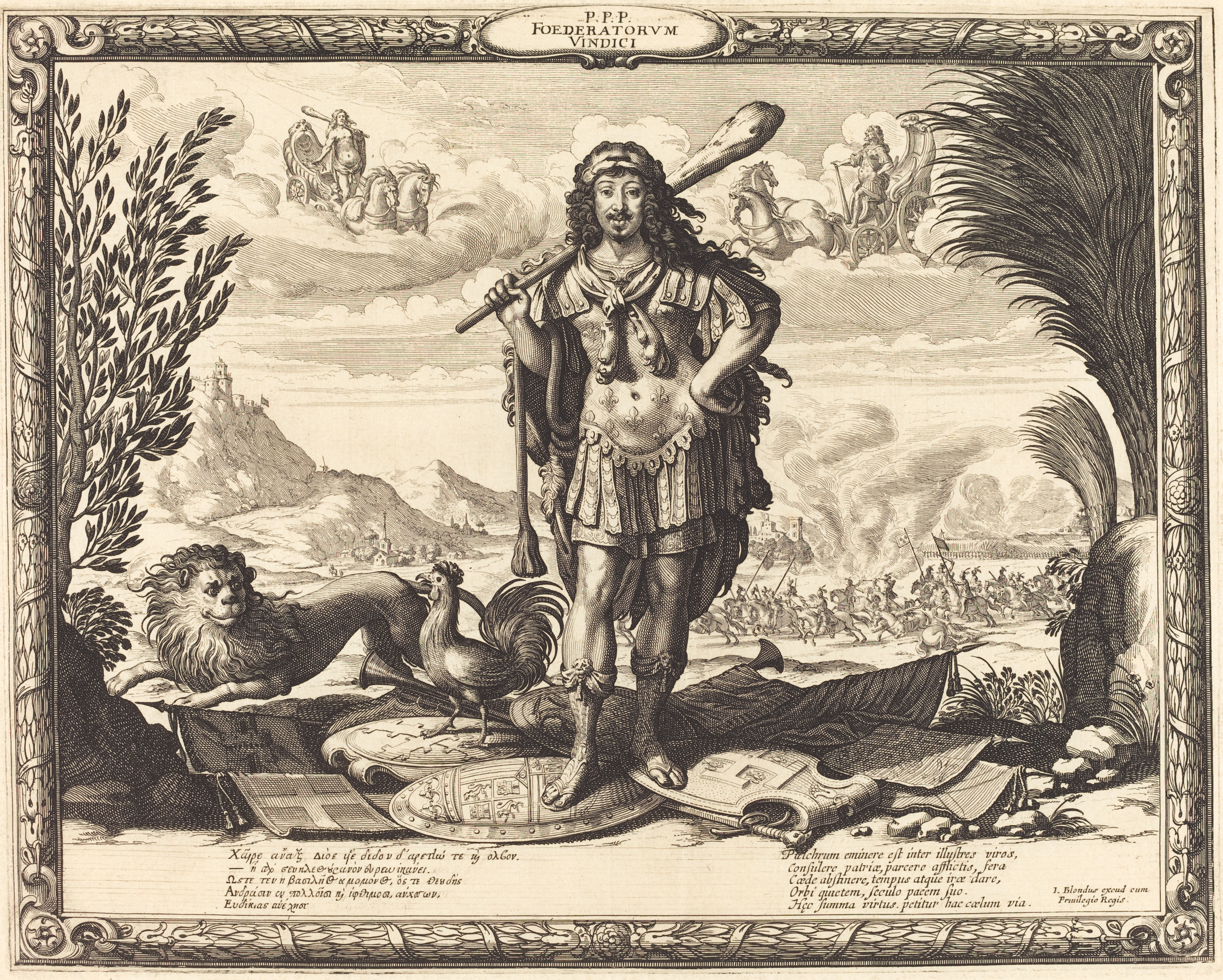
Louis XIII as Hercules, engraving and etching (National Gallery of Art)

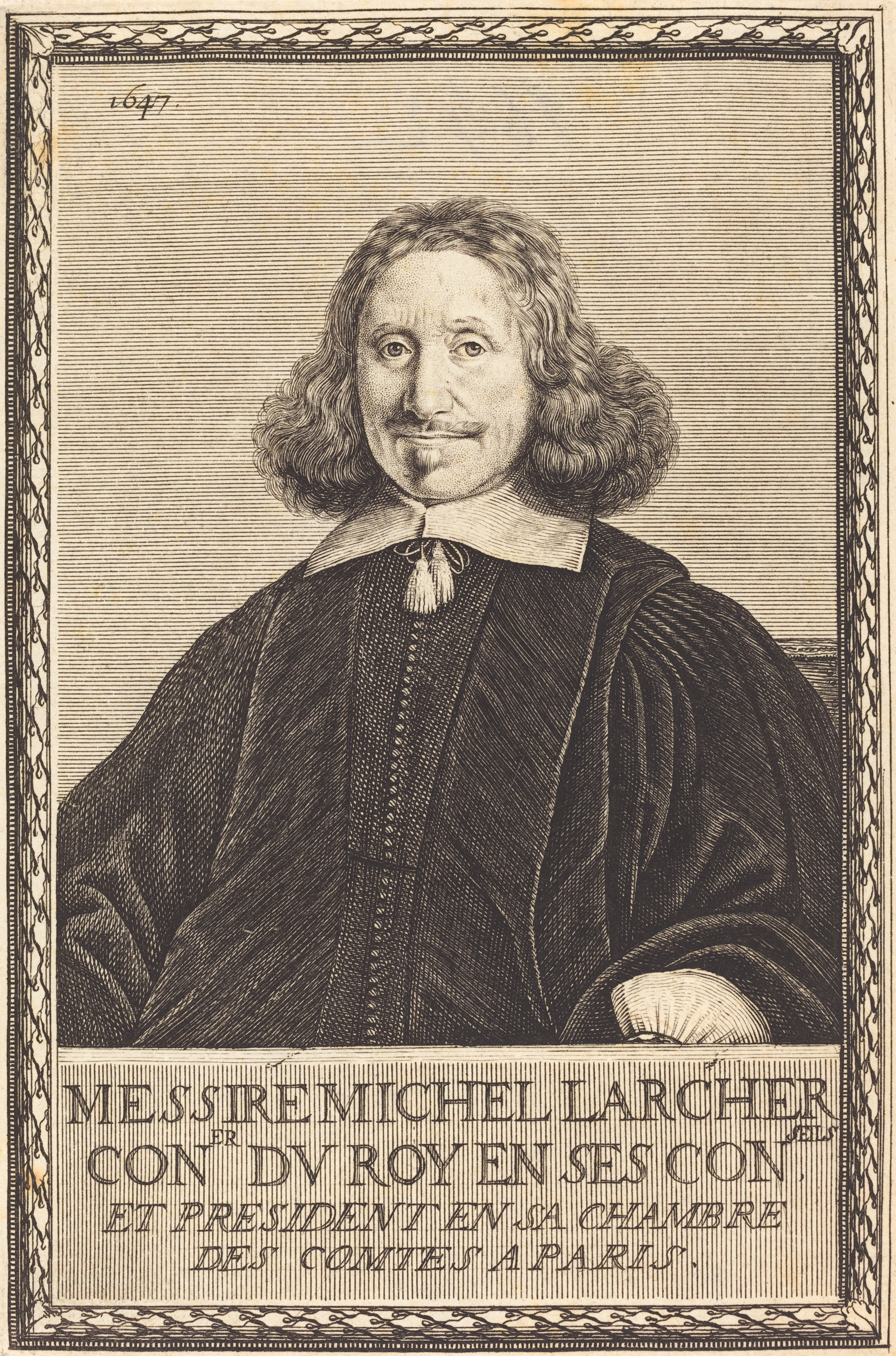
Michel Larcher, 1647, engraving (National Gallery of Art)

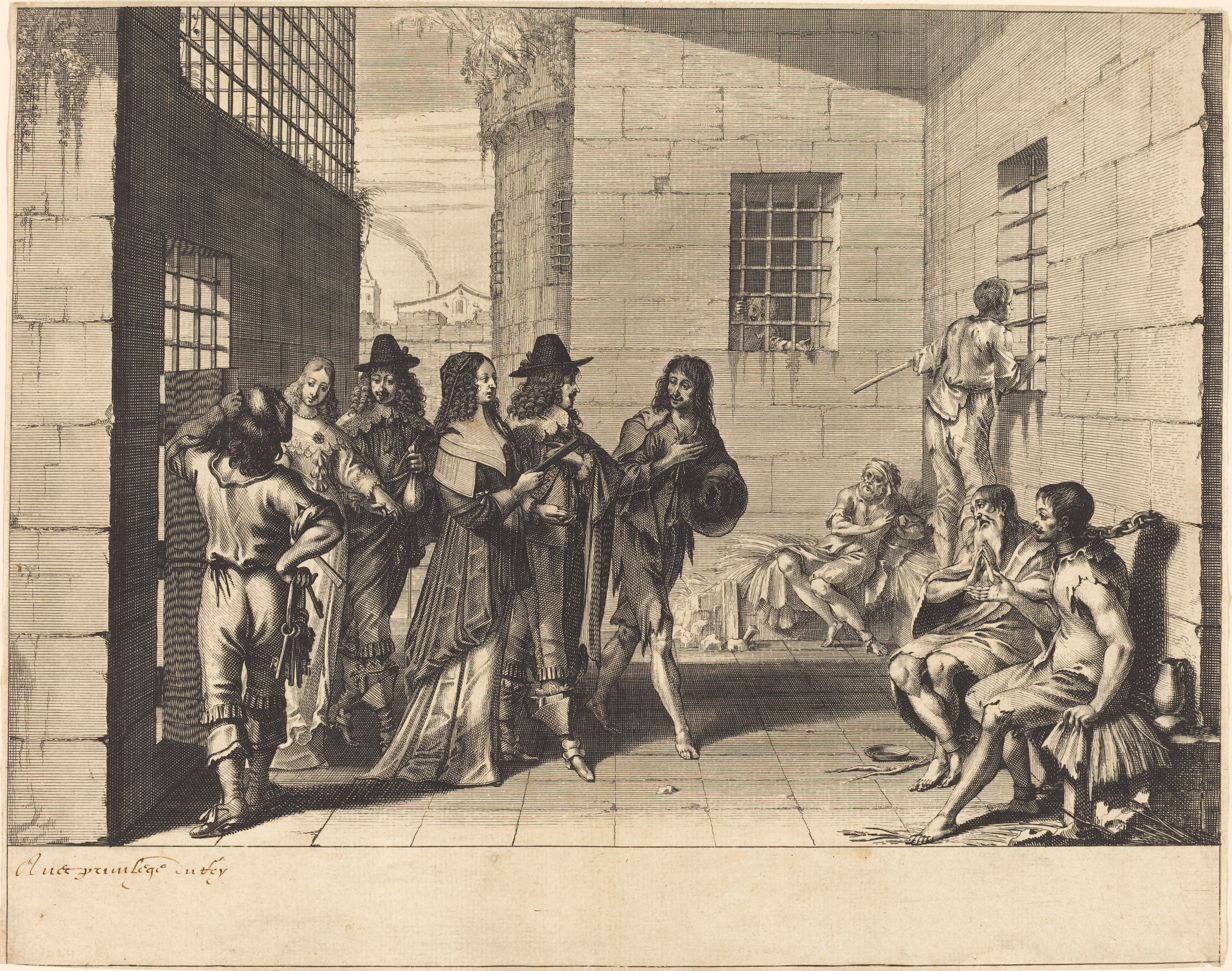
Gentry Visiting a Prison, engraving with etching, 25.4 x 32.2 cm (10 x 12 11/16 in.) (National Gallery of Art)

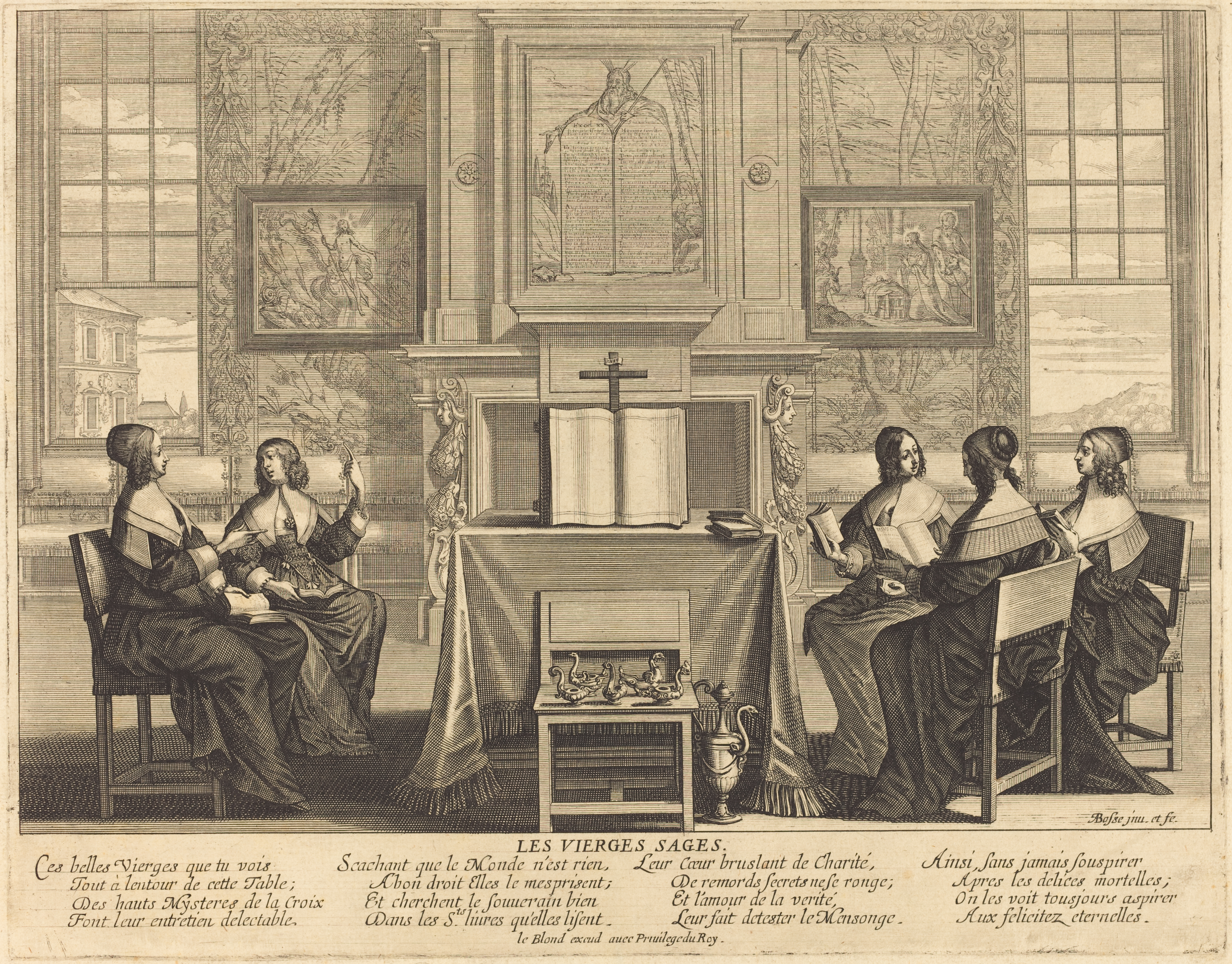
The Wise Virgins at Prayer, etching on laid paper, plate: 26 x 33 cm (10 1/4 x 13 in.) (National Gallery of Art)

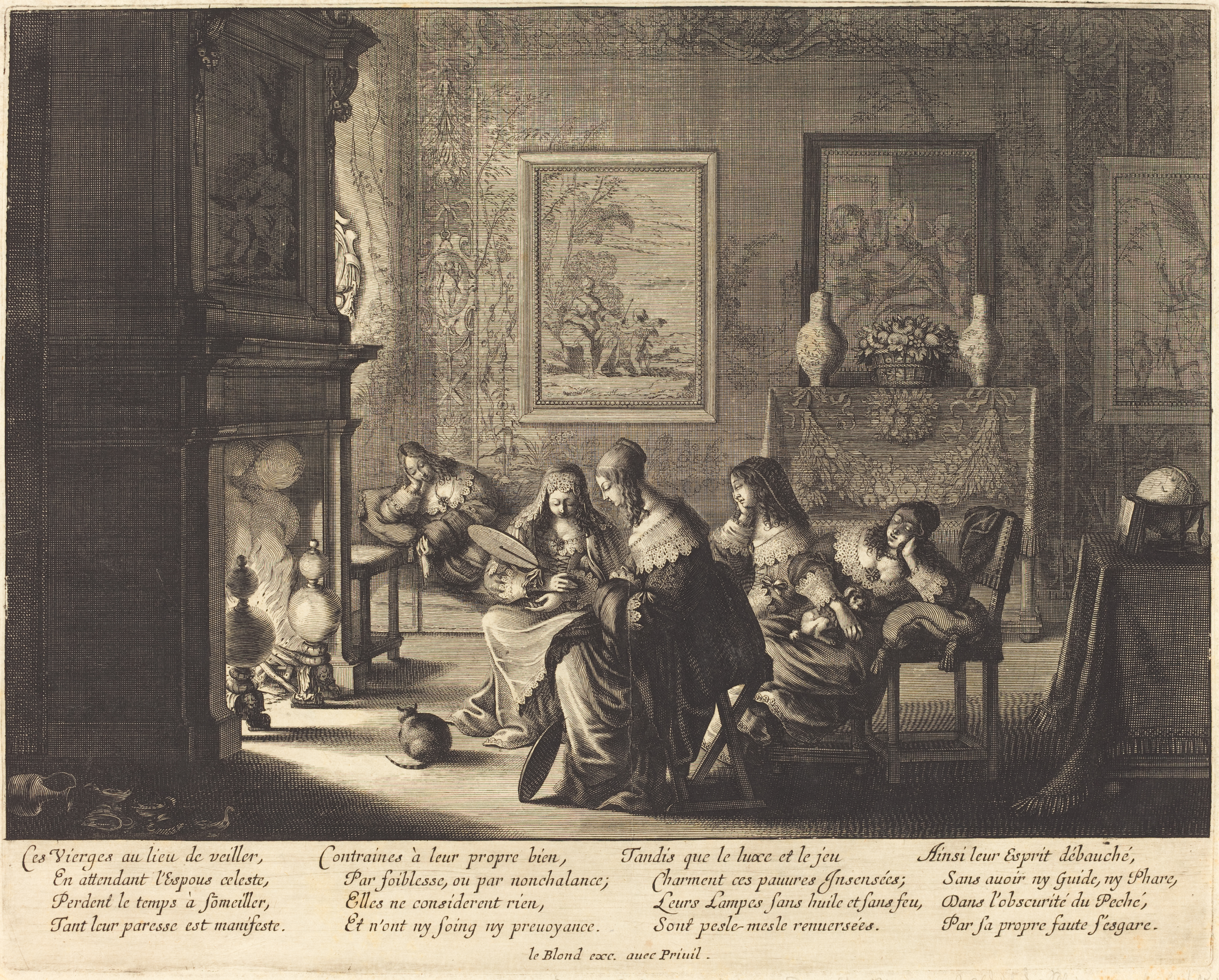
The Foolish Virgins Sleeping, etching on laid paper, plate: 25.4 x 32 cm (10 x 12 5/8 in.) sheet: 29.2 x 36.2 cm (11 1/2 x 14 1/4 in.) (National Gallery of Art)

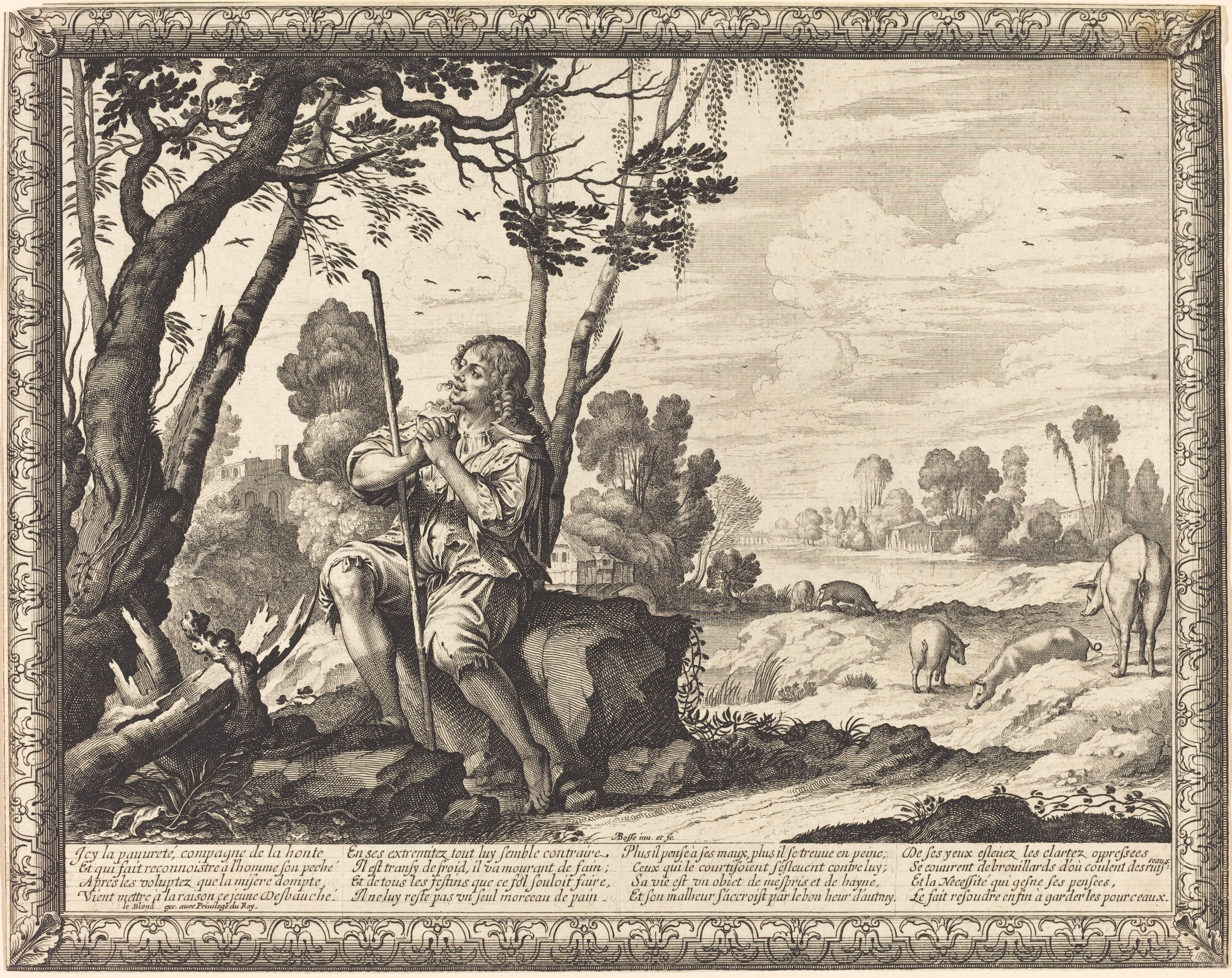
The Prodigal Son as a Swineherd, engraving (National Gallery of Art)

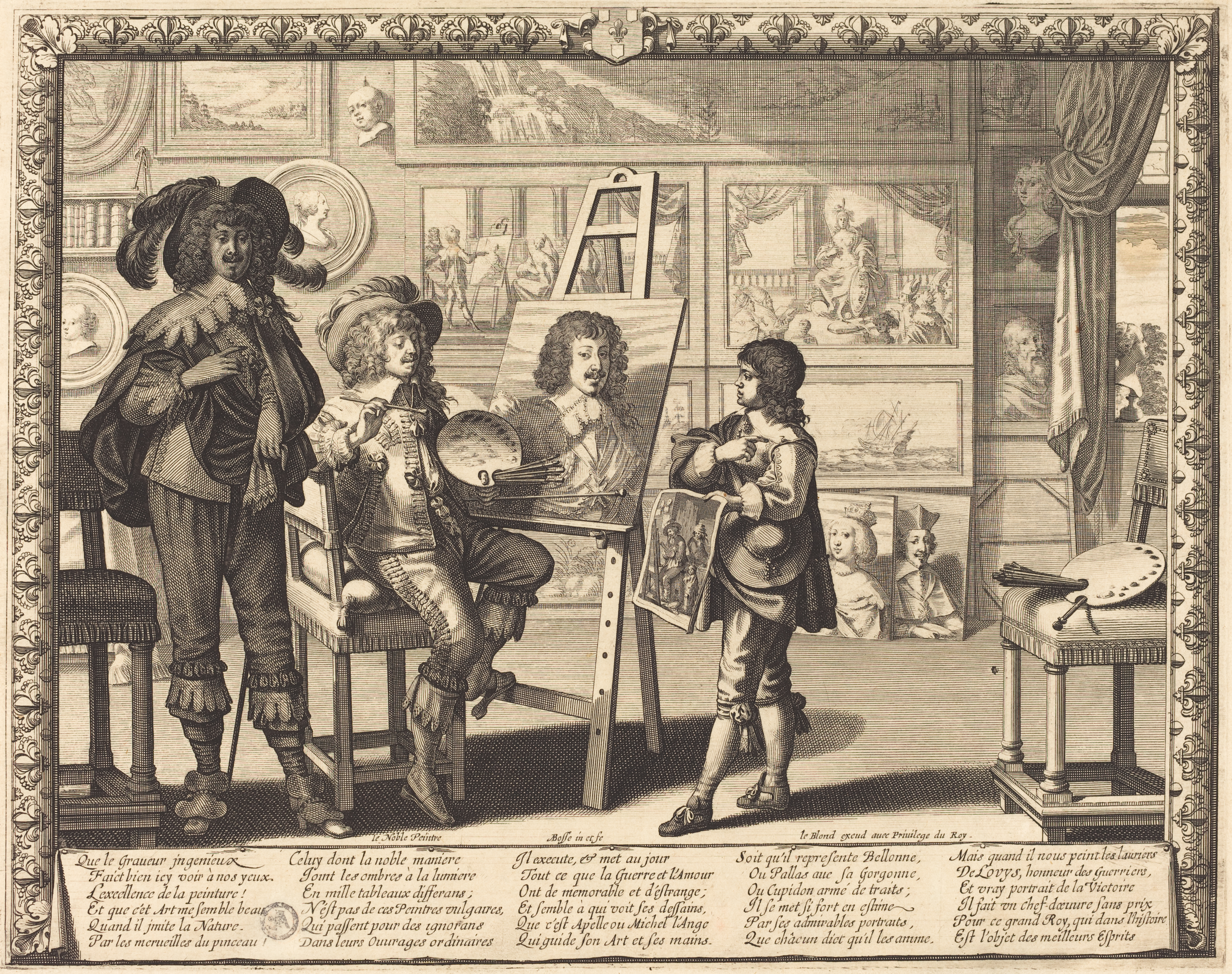
Le Noble Peintre, 1642, etching on laid paper, plate: 9 7/8 x 12 11/16 in. (25.1 x 32.2 cm), sheet: 26.4 x 33.3 cm (10 3/8 x 13 1/8 in.) (National Gallery of Art)

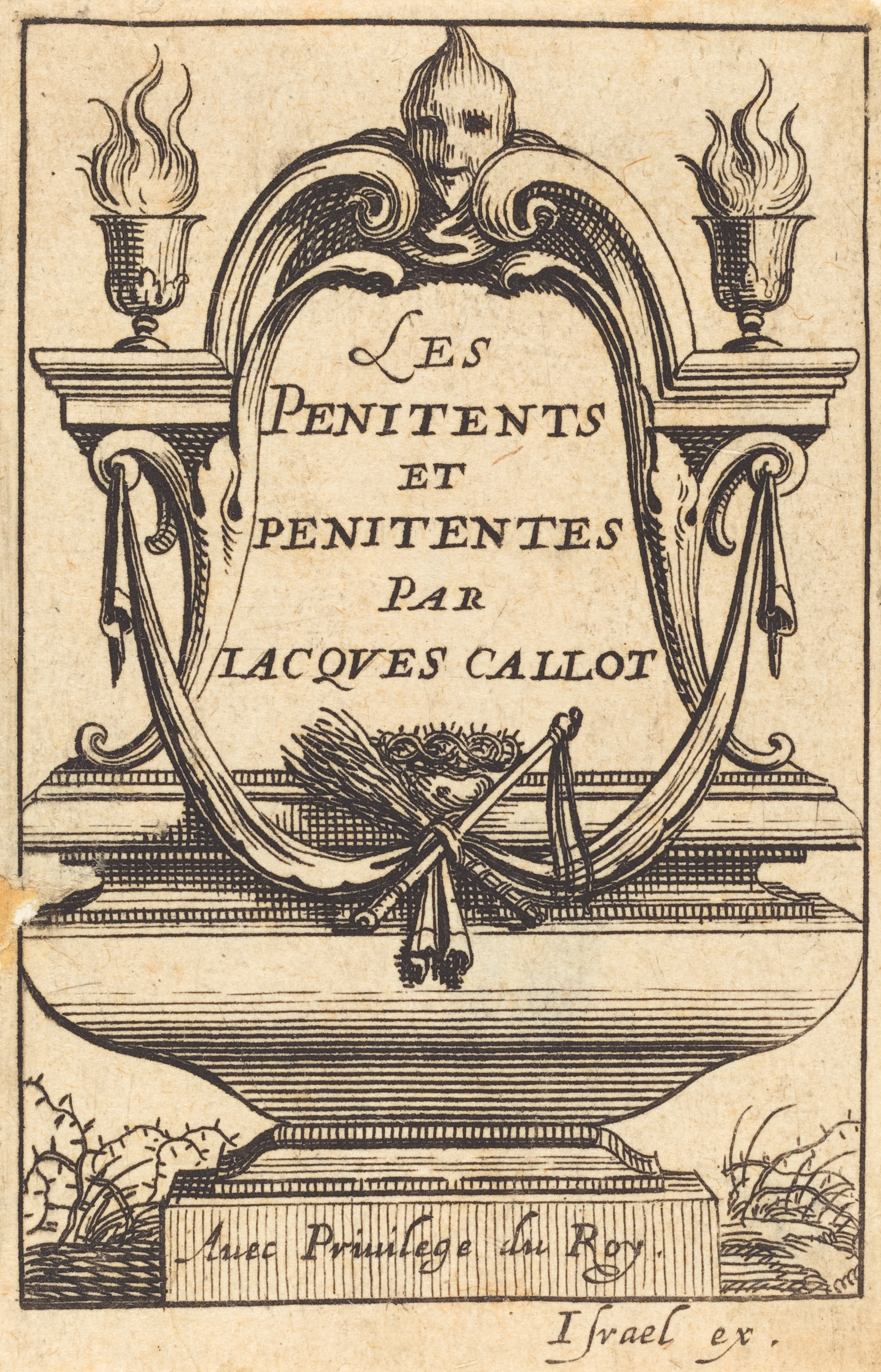
Frontispiece for Callot's "The Penitents", etching and engraving (National Gallery of Art)

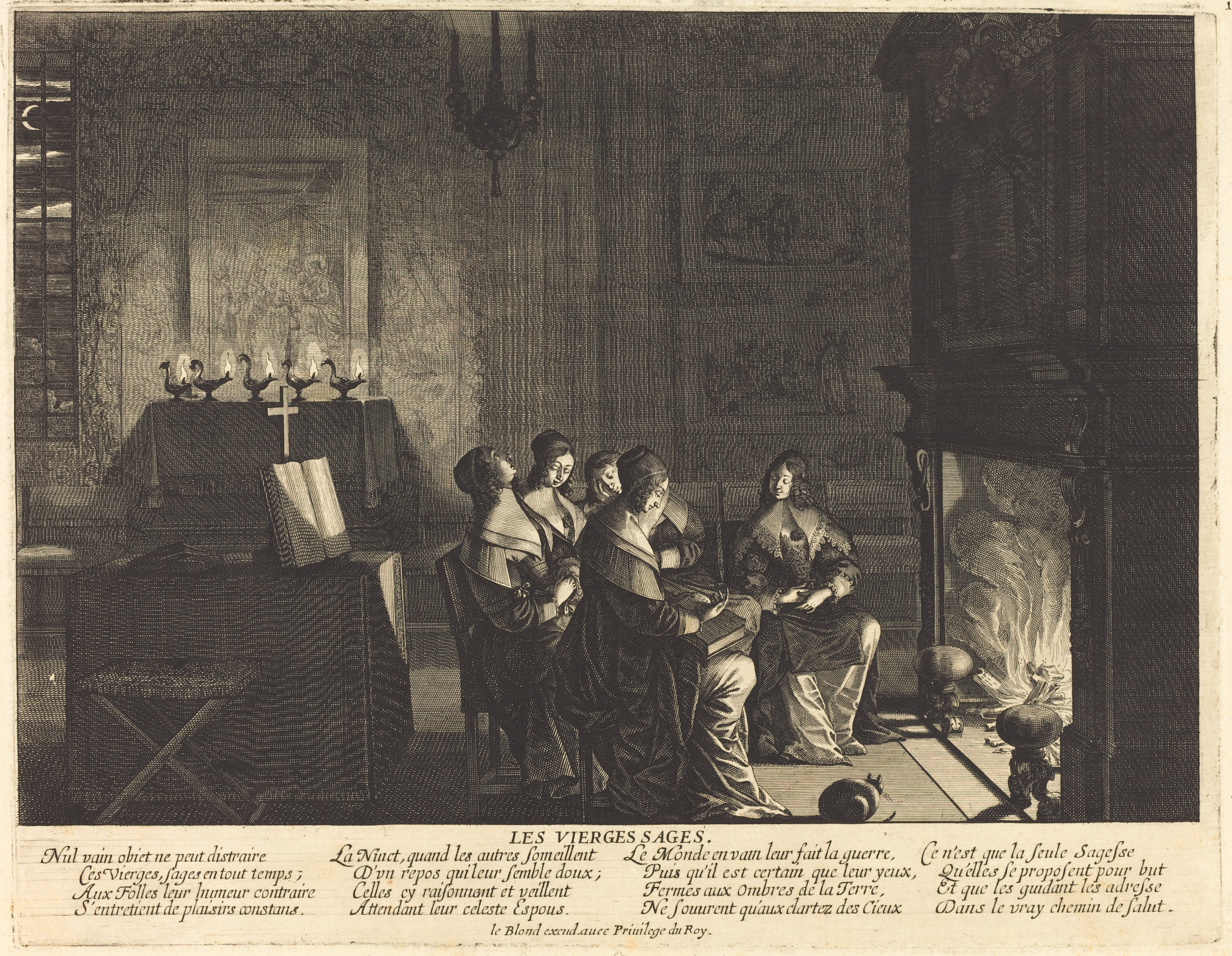
The Wise Virgins before the Fire, etching on laid paper, plate: 26 x 33 cm (10 1/4 x 13 in.) (National Gallery of Art)

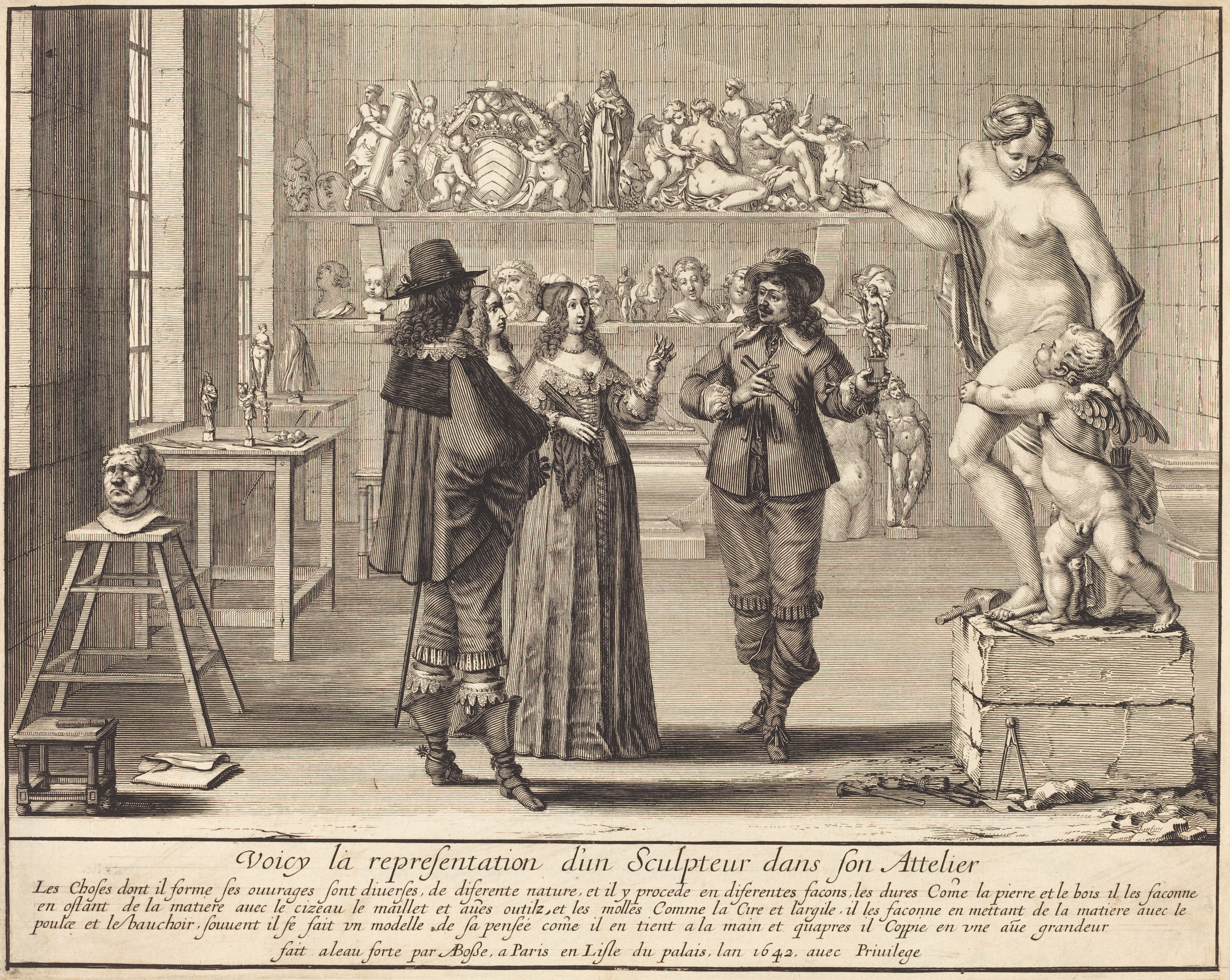
A Sculptor in His Atelier, 1642, etching, plate: 25.8 x 32.5 cm (10 3/16 x 12 13/16 in.) (National Gallery of Art)

== Bibliography ==
- Benezit (2006). "BOSSE, Abraham", vol. 2, pp. 922–923, in Benezit Dictionary of Artists. Paris: Gründ.
- Dhombres, Jean; Joël Sakharovitch, editors (1994). Desargues en son temps. Paris: Albert Blanchard. ISBN 9782853671880.
- Guerriaud, M. (2013), "Abraham Bosse et la gravure du doyen". Revue d’Histoire de la Pharmacie, vol. 378/379, pp. 289–301.
- Harrison, Colin (1996). "Bosse, Abraham", vol. 4, pp. 467–469, in The Dictionary of Art, 34 volumes, edited by Jane Turner. New York: Grove. ISBN 9781884446009.
- Join-Lambert, S.; J.-P. Manceau (1995). Abraham Bosse, graveur et sçavant. CRDP de la région Centre.. ISBN 2-903769-15-X
- Join-Lambert, S.; Maxime Préaud, editors (2004). Abraham Bosse, savant graveur. BNF-Musée des Beaux-arts de Tours, diffusion éd. du Seuil. ISBN 2-7177-2283-1.
- Vuillemin, Jean-Claude (2008). “Abraham Bosse”, vol. 1, pp. 176–179, in Dictionary of Seventeenth-Century French Philosophers, edited by L. Foisneau, 2 vols. London and New York: Thoemmes Continuum. ISBN 9780826418616.
