= Jean-Claude Vuillemin =

American philosopher

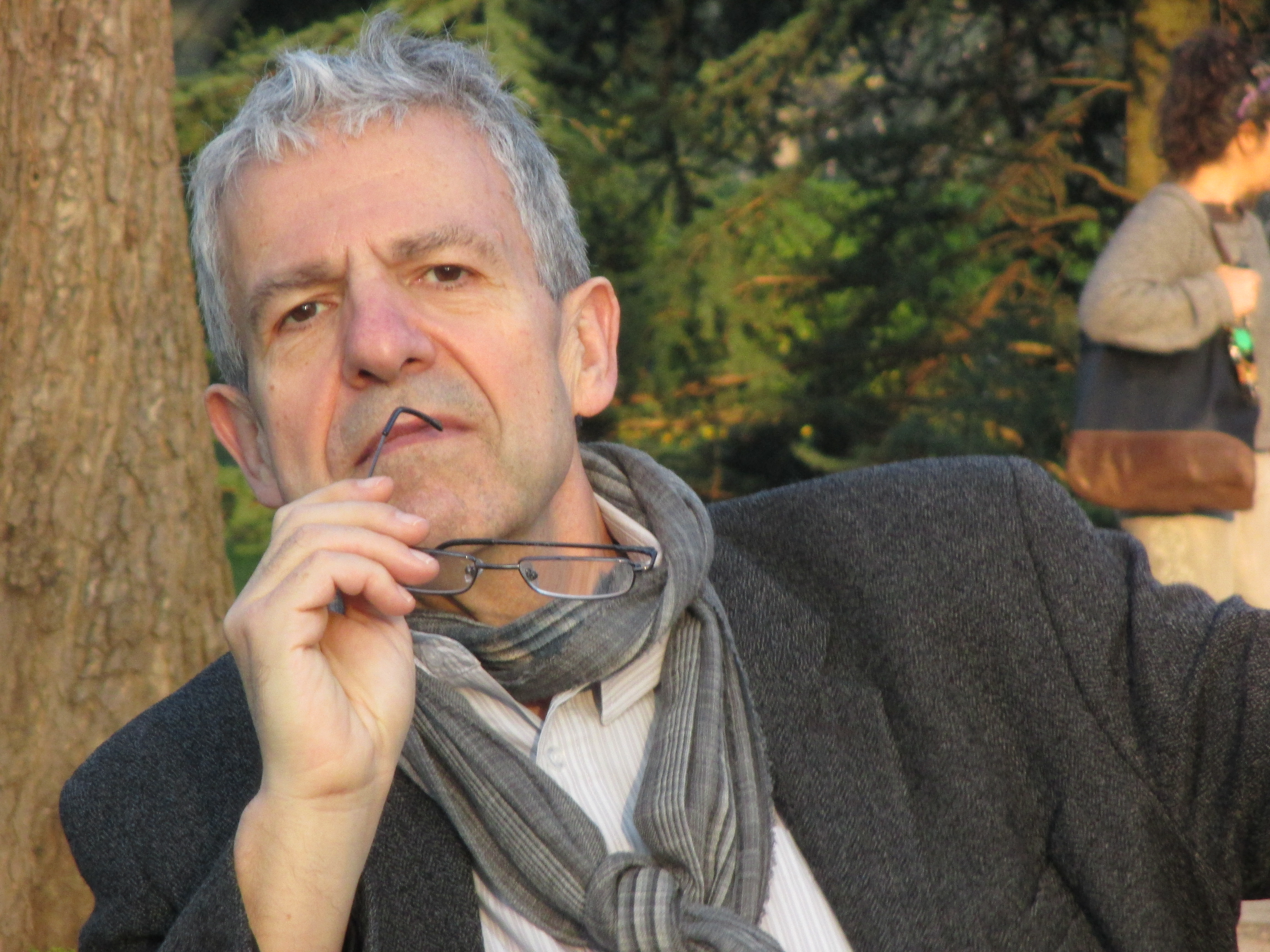
Jean-Claude Vuillemin

Jean-Claude Vuillemin (born 24 March 1954) is Liberal Arts Research Professor Emeritus of French literature in the Department of French and Francophone Studies at The Pennsylvania State University. In 2023, he became a member of the Penn State Emeritus Academy.

== Career ==
The recipient in March 2011 of the prestigious PSU Class of 1933 Award for Distinction in the Humanities, JC Vuillemin pursues research in 17th-Century French Literature and Philosophy; Post-structuralism and Reception theories; Baroque Episteme; Semiotics of Drama; Theater and Performance Theories; Continental Philosophy and Contemporary French Literature. Inspired by the Foucauldian notion of épistémè, and by the "linguistic turn" combined to the "actor paradigm," JC Vuillemin has continually challenged the ideological perception of a "classical" France and advocated the pertinence of the Baroque as a pertinent concept to be applied not only to architecture and visual arts, but also to literature and philosophy. Although it may be argued that a major methodological interest of the Baroque hypothesis lies in its very imprecision, his book, Épistémè baroque: le mot et la chose (Hermann, 2013) provides a new theory for a concept which JC Vuillemin associates with the epistemological breakdown Europe experienced in the wake of the emergence of Modern science. As a conceptual framework in which poetics, politics, and epistemology interact, his conception of the Baroque is much less aesthetic than purposefully philosophical. According to JC Vuillemin, Sapere aude ('dare to know') should be the motto of the Baroque.

JC Vuillemin collaborated to the first critical edition of Jean Rotrou’s complete theater (Belles-Lettres / Sorbonne-Paris-4, 1998-2019) and he published in 2017 an ongoing annotated digital bibliography: Jean de Rotrou: bibliographie critique . Vuillemin collaborated as well to the first Dictionary of Seventeenth-Century French Philosophers (Thoemmes Press / CNRS; trans. for Classiques Garnier). In addition to his book on Baroque episteme, he wrote one book on Rotrou’s dramaturgy (Baroquisme et théâtralité), three critical editions of Rotrou's plays (L’Hypocondriaque; L’Innocente Infidélité; La Belle Alphrède), and he has authored many articles, book chapters, and reviews. He frequently lectures on both sides of the Atlantic. In his latest book, Foucault l'intempestif (Hermann, 2019), JC Vuillemin revisits and clarifies some key concepts of the so-called "pensée Foucault," and pleads for the emergence of a "post-Cartesian" subject whose discourse (logos) will be congruent with his or her actions (ergon).

== Bibliography ==
=== Books ===
- Michel Foucault l'intempestif. Paris, Hermann, coll. "Philosophie", 2019
- Jean de Rotrou: bibliographie critique. University Park, Penn State U. Open Publishing, 2017
- Epistémè baroque: le mot et la chose. Paris, Hermann, coll. "Savoir Lettres", 2013
- Jean Rotrou, La Belle Alphrède, in G. Forestier, éd., Théâtre complet de Jean Rotrou. Vol. 9. Paris, SDTF-Les Belles Lettres, 2008
- Jean Rotrou, L’Innocente Infidélité, in Théâtre complet de Jean Rotrou. Vol. 7. Paris, SDTF-Les Belles Lettres, 2005
- Jean Rotrou, L'Hypocondriaque ou Le Mort amoureux. Édition critique. Genève, Droz, collection Textes littéraires français, 1999
- Esthétique baroque et imagination créatrice. Colloque de Cerisy-la-Salle. M. Kronegger et J-Cl. Vuillemin, éd., Tübingen, G. Narr Verlag, 1998
- Baroquisme et théâtralité: le théâtre de Jean Rotrou. Paris-Seattle-Tübingen, PFSCL-Biblio 17, 1994.

=== Selected articles ===
- "Les Essais de Montaigne: un ars bene vivendi," Implications philosophiques, (août 2025): https://www.implications-philosophiques.org/les-essais-de-montaigne-un-ars-bene-vivendi/.
- "Montaigne, à corps et âme," Europe, novembre-décembre 2024, 249-270.
- "Souci de Moi, appropriation et réhabilitation," Alkemie. Revue semestrielle de littérature et philosophie, 29 (2022-1), 75-96.
- "Philosopher (d’) après Foucault," Philosophie, science et société,(2019): https://philosciences.com/philosophie-generale/la-philosophie-et-sa-critique/375-philosopher-foucault.
- "Vanités: une invitation à jouir et à se réjouir?,” Quêtes littéraires, 8 (2019), 9-20.
- "Épistémologie du regard au seuil de la modernité,”Europe, 96 (Mai 2018), 295-312.
- "Foucault archéologue: généalogie d'un concept," Implications Philosophique, (2017): http://www.implications-philosophiques.org/implications-epistemologiques/foucault-archeologue-genealogie-dun-concept/
- "Le jeu et la jouissance: pour un ‘troisième temps’ du théâtre," Romance Notes, 56.2 (2016): 333-344.
- "Foucault et le classicisme: les œillères de l'histoire (littéraire), Fabula-LHT, 11, November 2013, "Pratique théorique et jouissance théâtrale," Poétique,174,2 (2013), pp. 189–213.
- "Réflexions sur l’épistémè foucaldienne," Cahiers philosophiques, 130 (2012), pp. 39–50.
- "Theatrum mundi: l’usage des mirages," Le Magazine Littéraire, 499 (2010), pp. 66–68.
- "Réflexions sur la réflexivité théâtrale," L’Annuaire théâtral, 45 (2010), pp. 119–136.
- "Theatrum mundi: désenchantement et appropriation," Poétique, 158 (2009), pp. 171–196.
- "Jean de Rotrou (1609-1650)," in M. de Boisdeffre, ed., Célébrations nationales 2009, Paris, Archives de France et Ministère de la Culture, 2009.
- "François Blondel," "Abraham Bosse," "Jean Desmarets de Saint-Sorlin," "Jean Racine," in Luc Foisneau, ed., Dictionary of Seventeenth-Century French Philosophers. 2 volumes, Londres et New York, Thoemmes Continuum, 2008.
- "Baroque: le mot et la chose," in Œuvres & Critiques. D. Scholl, ed., "La question du baroque," 32.2 (2007), pp. 13–21.
- "Jeux de théâtre et enjeu du regard," Littératures classiques. P. Pasquier ed., "Le théâtre de Rotrou," 63 (2007), pp. 239–249.
- "Tonner contre la tyrannie du verbe: spectacles baroques et discours classiques?," Études Épistémè, 9 (2006), pp. 307–329.
- "L’Œil de Galilée pour les yeux de Chimène: épistémologie du regard et la Querelle du Cid," Poétique, 142 (2005), pp. 153–168.
- "Le masque, la figure et le concombre: réflexions théâtrales," Littératures Classiques. H. Baby, ed., "Formes, genres, pratiques dramatiques au XVIIe siècle : la question du mineur," 51 (2004), pp. 69–89.
- "Stratégies et apories de l’éloquence sacrée: l’œuvre oratoire de Bossuet," in J.-Ph. Grosperrin, ed., Bossuet / Sermons. Anthologie critique. Paris, Klincksieck, 2002.
- "En finir avec Boileau... . Quelques réflexions sur l’enseignement du théâtre ‘classique’," Revue d’Histoire du Théâtre, 3 (2001), pp. 125-146.
- "Illusions comiques et dramaturgie baroque: Corneille, Rotrou et quelques autres," Papers on French Seventeenth-Century Literature, 28.55 (2001), pp. 307–325.
- "Baroque: pertinence ou obsolescence?," in R. Tobin, ed., Racine et/ou le classicisme. Tübingen, G Narr Verlag, 2001.
- "Littérature, esthétique et idéologie: la problématique baroque," Études Aveyronnaises (1999), pp. 203–222.
