= Sapere aude =

Latin phrase meaning "dare to know"

Sapere aude is the Latin phrase meaning "Dare to know". Originally used in the Roman poet Horace's First Book of Letters (20 BC), the phrase Sapere aude became associated with the Age of Enlightenment during the 17th and 18th centuries after Immanuel Kant used it in his essay "Answering the Question: What is Enlightenment?" (1784). As a philosopher, Kant claimed the phrase Sapere aude as the motto for the entirety of the Enlightenment period, and used it to develop his theories for the application of reason in the public sphere of human affairs.

In 1984, Michel Foucault's essay "What is Enlightenment?" took up Kant's formulation of "dare to know" in an attempt to find a place for the individual man and woman in post-structuralist philosophy, and so come to terms with what he alleges is the problematic legacy of the Enlightenment period. Moreover, in the essay The Baroque Episteme: The Word and the Thing (2013) Jean-Claude Vuillemin proposed that the Latin phrase Sapere aude be the motto of the Baroque episteme.

The phrase is widely used as a motto, especially by educational institutions.

== Usages ==
=== 1st century ===
Horace

The original use of the phrase Sapere aude appears in the First Book of Letters (20 BC), by the Roman poet Horace; in the second letter, addressed to Lolius, in line 40, the passage is: Dimidium facti, qui coepit, habet; sapere aude, incipe. ("He who has begun is half done; dare to know, begin!")

The phrase is the moral to a story in which a fool waits for a stream to cease flowing, before attempting to cross it. In saying, "He who begins is half done. Dare to know, begin!", Horace suggests the value of human endeavour, of persistence in reaching a goal, of the need for effort to overcome obstacles. Moreover, the laconic Latin of Sapere aude also can be loosely translated as the English phrase "Dare to be wise".

=== 4th century ===
Augustine

Augustine of Hippo quotes Horace's maxim in his early philosophical dialogue De quantitate animae, 23.41, telling his interlocutor Evodius not to be afraid of questioning his teaching on the capabilities of the soul:

Noli nimis ex auctoritate pendere, praesertim mea quae nulla est; et quod ait Horatius: 'Sapere aude', ne non te ratio subiuget priusquam metus.

"Don't rely so much on authority, especially on mine, which is null. There is also that saying from Horace: 'Dare to be wise!', so that fear may not subdue you more than reason does."

=== 16th century ===
Philip Melanchthon

In his inaugural address as Professor of Greek in Wittenberg on August 29, 1518, Philip Melanchthon quoted Horace's letter.

=== 18th century ===
Immanuel Kant

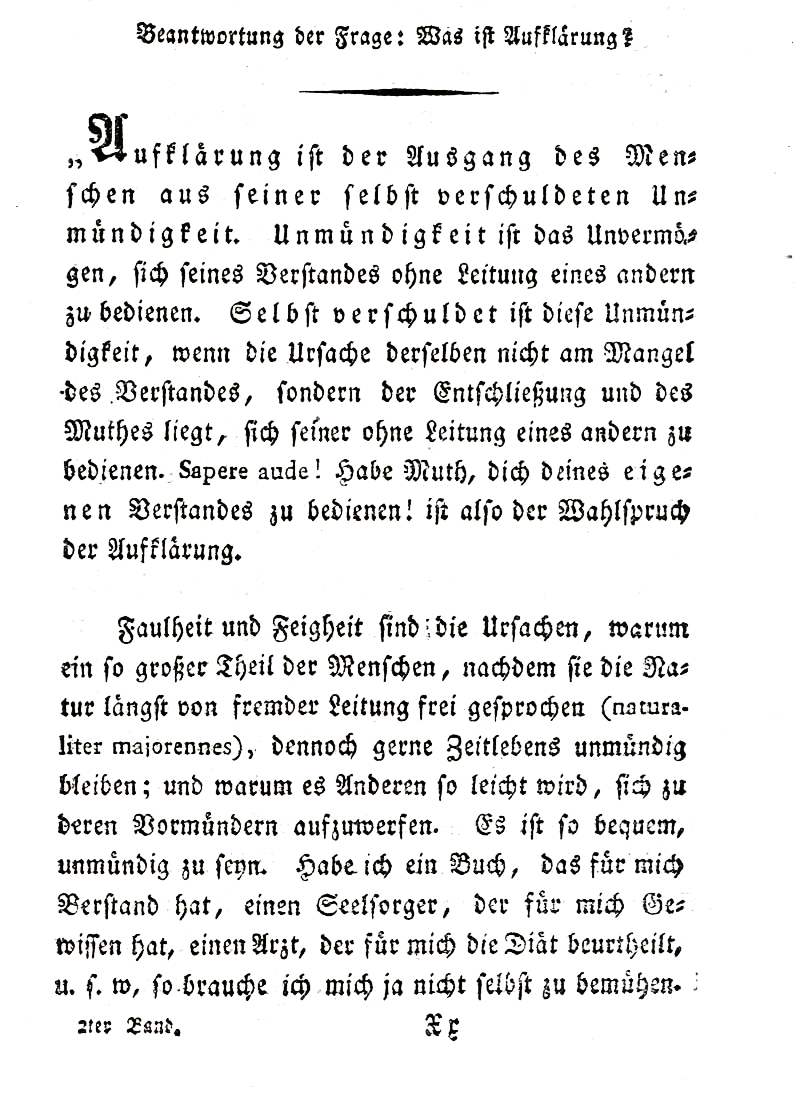
Answering the Question: What is Enlightenment?, by Immanuel Kant

In the essay, "Answering the Question: What Is Enlightenment?" (1784), Immanuel Kant describes the Age of Enlightenment as "Man's release from his self-incurred immaturity"; and, with the phrase Sapere aude, the philosopher charges the reader to follow such a program of intellectual self-liberation, by means of Reason. The essay is Kant's shrewd, political challenge to men and women, suggesting that the mass of "domestic cattle" have been bred, by unfaithful stewards, to not question what they have been told about the world and its ways.

Kant classifies the uses of reason as public and private. The public use of reason is discourse in the public sphere, such as political discourse (argument and analysis); the private use of reason is rational argument, such as that used by a person entrusted with a duty, either official or organizational. Skillfully praising King Frederick II of Prussia (r. 1740–86) for his intellectual receptiveness to the political, social, and cultural ideas of the Enlightenment, the philosopher Kant proposes that an enlightened prince is one who instructs his subjects to: "Argue as much as you will, and about what you will, only obey!"

=== 19th century ===
The founder of homeopathy, Samuel Hahnemann, used the phrase on the cover of his Organon of Medicine (various editions in 1810, 1819, 1824, 1829, 1833 and 1922).

In 1869 the newly founded University of Otago in Dunedin chose the phrase as their motto.

=== 20th century ===
Michel Foucault

In response to Immanuel Kant's Age of Enlightenment propositions for intellectual courage, in the essay "What is Enlightenment?" (1984), Michel Foucault rejected much of the hopeful politics proposed by Kant: a people ruled by just rulers; ethical leaders inspired by the existential dare advised in the phrase Sapere aude. Instead, Foucault applied ontology to examine the innate resources for critical thinking of a person's faculty of Reason. With the analytical value of Sapere aude reinforced by the concept of "Faithful betrayal" to impracticable beliefs, Foucault disputed the Enlightenment-era arguments that Kant presents in the essay "Answering the Question: What is Enlightenment?" (1784).

Like his 18th-century predecessor, Foucault also based his philosophic interpretation of Sapere aude upon a definite practice of critical thinking that is an "attitude, an ethos, a philosophical life in which [is found] the critique of what we are". Such an enlightened, intellectual attitude applies reason to experience, and so effects a historical criticism of "the limits that are imposed on us". The criticism is "an experiment with the possibility of going beyond" imposed limits, in order to reach the limit-experience, which simultaneously is an individual, personal act, and an act that breaks the concept of the individual person.

Vincent Massey

Vincent Massey choose the phrase Sapere aude as the motto of Massey College in Toronto that the Massey foundation established in 1963 as residential college, a self-governing unit of the University of Toronto.

== See also ==
- Canadian Armed Forces Cyber Command has this as its motto.
- Crompton House Church of England School, Oldham, has this as its motto.
- Durham Johnston Comprehensive School, founded in 1901, has Sapere aude as its motto.
- Epistularum liber primus, Horace's work containing the original phrase.
- Ghent University, founded in 1817, has Sapere aude as its motto.
- Liberal Arts and Science Academy, Austin, Texas, US, has this as its motto.
- Lutterworth College, founded in 1880 (as Lutterworth Grammar School), has Sapere aude as its motto.
- Manchester Grammar School, founded in 1515, has Sapere aude as its motto.
- Miguel de Cervantes European University, founded in 2002, has Sapere aude as its motto.
- Moscow Institute of Physics and Technology, has the motto highlight the school's tradition in ground-breaking fundamental research.
- Oldham Athletic Football Club, Oldham, UK, has this as its motto.
- Richmond Hill High School, Ontario, Canada, has this as its motto.
- St. Columba's School, Delhi, uses Sapere aude as its motto.
- The School of Advanced Warfighting, Marine Corps University, Quantico, Virginia, US, has this as its motto.
- Staffordshire University, adopted Sapere aude as its motto in 2019.
- The Tiffin Girls' School, London, UK, has this as its motto.
- University of Otago, New Zealand: the phrase serves as its motto; the students' association replies in kind with its motto Audeamus (let us dare)
- Vilnius TECH, Vilnius, Lithuania, uses Sapere aude as its motto.
- Wesley College, Melbourne, founded in 1866, has Sapere aude as its motto.
- West London Free School, London, UK, has this as its motto.
