= Canadian Armed Forces Cyber Command =

- Commandement Cyber des Forces armées canadiennes
- Badge of CAFCYBERCOM
- Active: 26 September 2024 – present
- Country: Canada
- Branch: Canadian Armed Forces
- Type: Unified combatant command and cyber force
- Role: Cyber warfare
- Part of: Canadian Armed Forces
- Garrison/HQ: Ottawa
- Nicknames: CAFCYBERCOM (English nickname); COMCYBERFAC (French nickname)
- Motto: Sapere aude (Latin for 'Dare to know')
- Website: www.canada.ca/en/department-national-defence/corporate/organizational-structure/cafcybercom.html

Commanders
- Commander: Major-General Dave Yarker

The Canadian Armed Forces Cyber Command (CAFCYBERCOM; French: Commandement Cyber des Forces armées canadiennes or COMCYBERFAC) is a formation of the Canadian Armed Forces.

CAFCYBERCOM is responsible for cyber operations, cyber force sustainment, management, and development. CAFCYBERCOM also works alongside NORAD, Five Eyes, and NATO.

== History ==
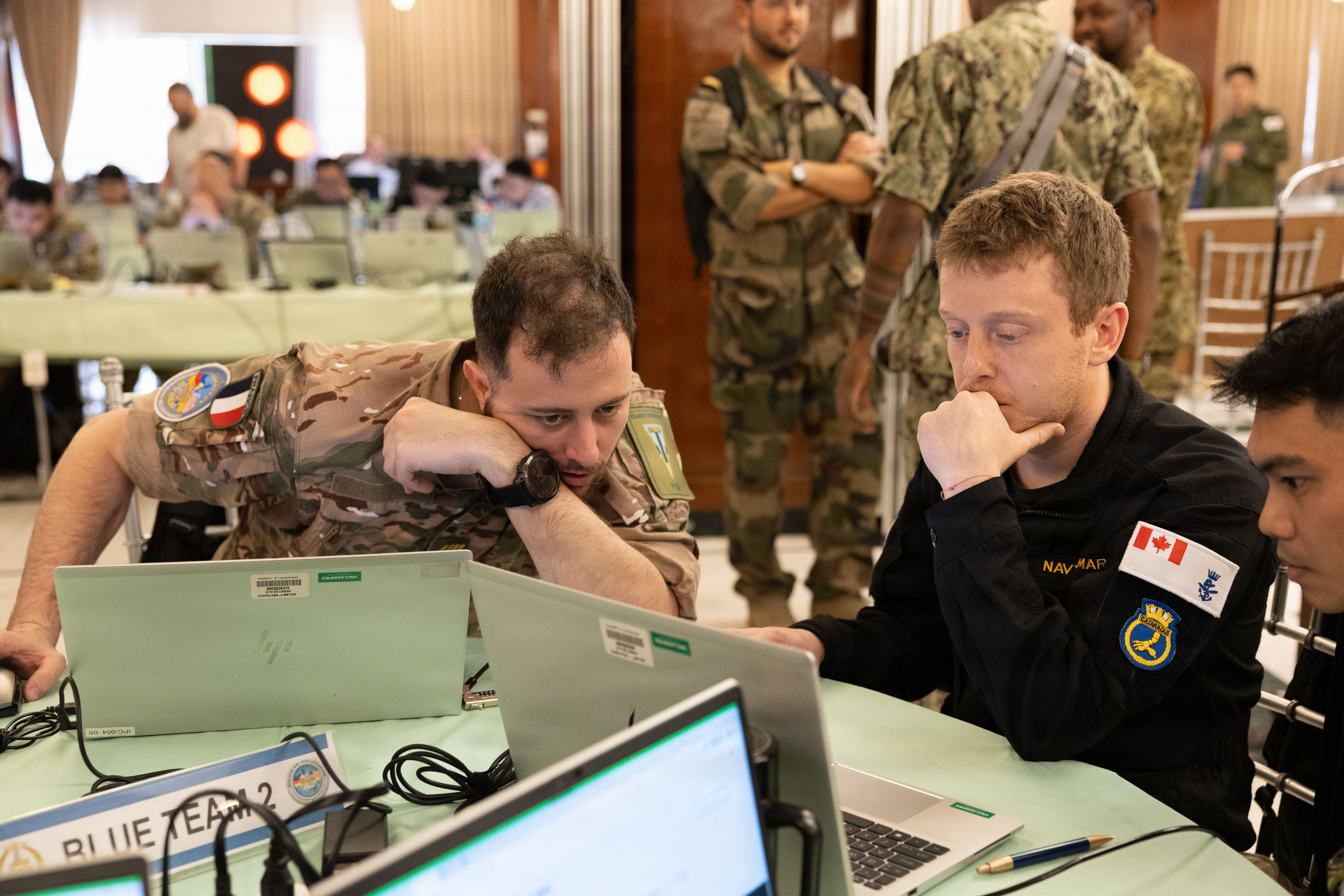
CAF CYBERCOM operator from RCN during Balikatan 2026.

The Canadian Armed Forces Cyber Command was formed on 26 September 2024. Major-General Dave Yarker was appointed as the commanding officer of CAFCYBERCOM.

In July 2025, Major-General Yarker was in the Philippines to establish cooperation with Cyber Command (AFPCyCom) of the Armed Forces of the Philippines. In September 2025, CAFCYBERCOM and the Japan Self-Defense Forces' Cyber Defense Command (JCDC) participated in a bilateral exercise known as MASAKARI 25.

From November 28 to December 6, 2025, CAFCYBERCOM participated in NATO's Cyber Coalition exercise in Estonia.
