= Véronique Munoz-Dardé =

British philosopher

Education
- Education: European University Institute (PhD)

Philosophical work
- Era: 21st-century philosophy
- Region: Western philosophy
- Institutions: University College London; University of California at Berkeley
- Main interests: ethics, political philosophy

Véronique Munoz-Dardé is Professor of Philosophy in the University College London Department of Philosophy and Mills Adjunct Professor of Philosophy at University of California at Berkeley. She is known for her works on ethics and political philosophy.

== Books ==
- La justice sociale :Le libéralisme égalitaire de John Rawls, Nathan Université 2000

== See also ==
- Luc Foisneau
