= Dictionary of Seventeenth-Century French Philosophers =

Biographical dictionary

- Publication date: 2008
- ISBN: 0-82641-861-9

The Dictionary of Seventeenth-Century French Philosophers is a dictionary of philosophical writers in France between 1601 and 1700, edited by Luc Foisneau. An augmented and revised French edition has been published in 2015.

== Content ==
The Dictionary of Seventeenth-Century French Philosophers presents, in alphabetical order, the work of 582 authors of philosophical texts between 1601 and 1700. Understanding the seventeenth-century use of the term ‘philosophy’ in its broadest sense, this dictionary is an encyclopaedia of Early Modern thought encompassing intellectual traditions from scholastic philosophy to literature, poetry, politics, art and sciences. This Dictionary demonstrates the ways in which the lives and works of even minor writers can reveal hitherto unsuspected connections between currants of thought, theories of knowledge, and religious and political allegiances

Published in London and New York in December 2008, the Dictionary is part of an international intellectual project to cover these themes on a country-by-country basis, from the seventeenth to the twentieth centuries This innovative method of studying philosophy is unique in privileging relatively unknown authors, an approach which is continued in the French edition: Dictionnaire des philosophes français du XVIIe siècle: acteurs et réseaux du savoir. These volumes have enlarged the field of study, with 108 supplementary entries and eight thematic introductions which, following the preface by Luc Foisneau, suggest other possible intellectual routes: ‘The French Cartesians’ (Emmanuel Faye); ‘Scholastic philosophies and theologies’ (Jacob Schmutz); ‘"Libertines" and free thinking’ (Isabelle Moreau); ‘Clandestine thought’ (Gianni Paganini); ‘The sciences’ (Philippe Hamou); ‘Theories of Art’ (Carole Talon-Hugon); ‘Religious controversies and the birth of the Republic of letters (Antony McKenna); ‘Philosophical places, sociabilities and practices’ (Stéphane Van Damme) The French version further provides a historical index of more than 300 pages, providing biographical and bibliographical information. These entries are an especially useful research aid.

== Contributors ==
The Dictionnaire has been written by 167 scholars of 9 nationalities (French, German, American, British, Canadian, Dutch, Italian, Swiss and Czech). These include: Roger Ariew, Séverine Auffret, Laurent Avezou, Ann Blair, Olivier Bloch, Laurent Bove, Jean-Charles Darmon, Philippe Desan, Emmanuel Faye, Jean-Pierre Faye, Luc Foisneau, Daniel Garber, Catherine Goldstein, Thierry Gontier, Philippe Hamou, Thierry Hoquet, Jacques Le Brun, Franck Lessay, Jacqueline Lichtenstein, Antony McKenna, Noel Malcolm, Jean-Marc Mandosio, Rémi Mathis, Isabelle Moreau, Steven Nadler, Sophie Nicholls, Gianni Paganini, Martine Pécharman, Lawrence Principe, Andrew Pyle, Tad Schmalz, Jacob Schmutz, Jean-Fabien Spitz, Carole Talon-Hugon, Michel Terestchenko, Stéphane Van Damme, Philippe Vendrix, Eliane Viennot, Jean-Claude Vuillemin.
