= Luc Foisneau =

French philosopher

Luc Foisneau, born in Blois on 30 March 1963, is a French philosopher specialising in contemporary political thought and that of the Early Modern period. Director of research at CNRS, he is a member of the Centre Raymond Aron, and teaches at School for Advanced Studies in the Social Sciences.

== Biography ==
A former student of the Ecole normale supérieure (Fontenay-St Cloud) he has a PhD from Paris 1 - Panthéon-Sorbonne and his habilitation (HDR) from Ecole des hautes études en sciences sociales. From 1993 to 1995 he was a member of the Centre de philosophie politique et juridique, in the University of Caen, and from 1995 to 2003 a member of the Centre d'histoire de la philosophie moderne. In 2003 he joined the Department of Politics and International Relations at the University of Oxford, pursuing research there and at the Maison Française until 2006. He was also lecturer at Sciences Po, Paris, from 1993 to 2003.

== Research Themes ==
Foisneau wrote his doctoral thesis on the notion of the absolute power of God in Thomas Hobbes' political theory, notwithstanding Hobbes' reputation as a renowned atheist. Foisneau analysed this under-explored conception of power in relation to the fundamental moral and political principles underpinning Leviathan. In 2001 he was awarded the Prix de l'association des professeurs et maîtres de conférences de Sciences Po, Paris. He is recognised as a world expert on the work of Thomas Hobbes, which he has edited and translated into French. Foisneau also devoted fifteen years of research to one of the fundamental aspects of modern political thought: the connection between theories of sovereignty and theories of government. He has since turned his attention to the work of John Rawls, and in particular the manner in which Early Modern contract theories were reprised and transformed in the Rawlsian tradition of theories of justice. In particular, he has focused on the ways in which the idea of justification has had a profound effect in transforming theories of modern democracy. Between 2001 and 2015 Foisneau directed work on an encyclopaedia of French philosophers and their networks in the seventeenth century in which 167 scholars participated. An English edition of the encyclopaedia was published in 2008, entitled Dictionary of Seventeenth-Century French Philosophers. An augmented French edition will be published in 2015 as Dictionnaire des philosophes français du XVIIe siècle : acteurs et réseaux de savoir.

== Publications ==
=== Books ===
- Hobbes et la toute-puissance de Dieu, Paris, Presses universitaires de France, 2000, 422 p. (ISBN 2-13-050956-8).
- Governo e Soberiana : O pensamento politico moderno de Maquiavel a Rousseau, Porto Alegre, Linus Editores, 2009, 200 p. (ISBN 978-85-60063-08-6).
- Hobbes. La vie inquiète, Paris, Gallimard, 2016, 624 p. (ISBN 9782070467884).
- Manières de gouverner. Politiques modernes de la souveraineté, Paris, CNRS Éditions, 2025, 224 p. (ISBN 9782271136961).

=== Edited works ===
- Politique, droit et théologie chez Bodin, Grotius et Hobbes, Paris, Kimé, 1997, 314 p. (ISBN 2-84174-096-X).
- La découverte du principe de raison. Descartes, Hobbes, Spinoza, Leibniz, Paris, Presses Universitaires de France, 2001, 204 p.
- L'efficacia della volontà nel XVI e XVII secolo, with P. F. Adorno, Rome, Edizioni di storia e letteratura, 2002, 208 p. (ISBN 88-8498-060-7).
- Leviathan After 350 Years, with T. Sorell, Oxford, Clarendon Press, 2004, 314 p. (ISBN 0-19-926461-9).
- New critical perspectives on Leviathan upon the 350th anniversary of its publication/ Nuove prospettive critiche sul Leviatano di Hobbes nel 350° anniversario di pubblicazione, with G. Wright, Milan, Franco Angeli, 2004, 374 p. (ISBN 88-464-5561-4).
- Kant et Hobbes. De la violence à la politique, with D. Thouard, Paris, Vrin, 2005, 252 p. (ISBN 2-7116-1736-X).
- Dictionary of Seventeenth-Century French Philosophers, New York/London, Thoemmes Continuum, 2008, 2 vols, 1314 p. (ISBN 978-0-82641-861-6).
- Spheres of Global Justice. Volume 1. Global Challenges to Liberal Democracy. Political Participation, Minorities and Migrations, with J.-Ch. Merle, Ch. Hiebaum et J. C. Velasco, Dordrecht, Springer, 2013, 450 p. (ISBN 978-94-007-5997-8).
- Dictionnaire des philosophes français du XVIIe siècle: acteurs et réseaux du savoir, with E. Dutartre-Michaut and Ch. Bachelier, Paris, Classiques Garnier, 2015, 2 vols, 2150 p. (ISBN 978-2-8124-1721-4).

=== Translations ===
- Thomas Hobbes, Les Questions concernant la liberté, la nécessité et le hasard, Introduction, notes, glossary and index by L. Foisneau; translated by L. Foisneau and Fl. Perronin, Paris, Vrin, 1999, 456 p. (ISBN 2-7116-2124-3).
- John Rawls, Justice et critique, Preface and translation by L. Foisneau and V. Munoz-Dardé, Paris, Ed. EHESS, 2014, 90 p. (ISBN 978-2-7132-2411-9).

=== Chapters and articles ===
- " Leviathan's Theory of Justice ", in T. Sorell and L. Foisneau (eds), Leviathan After 350 Years, Oxford, Clarendon Press, 2004, pp. 105–122.
- " Beyond the Air-pump: Hobbes, Boyle and the Omnipotence of God ", in L. Foisneau and G. Wright (eds), New Critical Perspectives on Leviathan Upon the 350th Anniversary of its Publication, Milan, Franco Angeli, 2004, pp. 33–49.
- " Omnipotence, Necessity and Sovereignty: Hobbes and the Absolute and Ordinary Powers of God and King ", in P. Springborg (ed.), The Cambridge Companion to Hobbes's Leviathan, Cambridge, Cambridge University Press, 2007, pp. 271–290.
- " Personal Identity and Human Mortality: Hobbes, Locke, Leibniz ", in S. Hutton and P. Schuurman (eds), Studies on Locke: Sources, Contemporaries, and Legacy, Dordrecht, Springer, 2008, pp. 89–105.
- " Sovereignty and Reason of state: Bodin, Botero, Richelieu and Hobbes ", in H. A. Lloyd (ed.), The Reception of Bodin, Dordrecht, Brill, Leiden/Boston, 2013, pp. 323–342.
- " What is "political" about minority rights? ", in J.-Ch. Merle, L. Foisneau, Ch. Hiebaum, J. C. Velasco (eds), Spheres of Global Justice. Volume 1. Global Challenges to Liberal Democracy. Political Participation, Minorities and Migrations, Dordrecht, Springer, 2013, pp. 143–154.

=== Children's books ===
- Pourquoi aimes-tu tes amis ?, illustrations by A. Parlange, Paris, Gallimard-Jeunesse, coll. Giboulées/Chouette penser !, 2012, 80 p. (ISBN 978-2-0706-4348-6).
