= Wilfrid Desan =

Wilfrid Desan (1908– 14 January 2001) was a professor in philosophy best known for introducing French existentialism and especially the thought of Jean-Paul Sartre to the United States. He was a native of Belgium who emigrated to the United States in 1948, where he gained a doctorate from Harvard University in 1951 and met his wife Elisabeth. In 1952, he gained a lectureship at the philosophy department of Kenyon College. In 1957, he joined Georgetown University where he remained for the rest of his academic career and where he enjoyed a good reputation as teacher and a clear writer. He also had appointments as distinguished visiting professor at Villanova University and visiting professor at George Mason University. He developed his own noetic philosophy in his three-volume work The Planetary Man, a prescient, pioneering vision of globalisation unifying the world's peoples.

== Planetary philosophy ==
Desan argues that as unique individuals we originate as parts of a larger whole, which he calls the totum, and we are destined to return to this totum through meaningful dialogue, which the whole enables. Individuals may be unique or unequal, but that does not necessarily have to be the cause of serious conflict among persons or nations. Precisely because of their differences, they can complement each other.

Each person or nation by itself is considered incomplete (fragmented) in being and in knowledge, and each approaches reality subjectively from a specific angle. Therefore, each can only arrive at partial truths on their own. If true and universal objectivity is to be achieved at the level of noesis, Desan argues that then we must cooperate, in particular by acquiring a globalising viewpoint which transcends our own limited and incomplete understandings, and in this way become "planetary persons" who, realizing the limits of the "angular visions" of each, reach insight in the totum to ensure its survival, considered as the highest good.

The truly "planetary person" is regarded in Desan's philosophy as a saint, and as a diplomat or cosmopolite. For Desan, the planetary person is the savior of the totum because God's work, assuming the divine truly exists, is in fact our own work, and therefore "salvation" (in the secular sense of survival) must be ensured through practical human efforts made toward planetary unification. Using the techniques of phenomenology, he examines the forms and characteristics of the new awareness and the ways of relating that will be required of human beings in a global environment.

Desan's philosophy is deeply committed to the inviolability of the individual, and borrows, articulates or integrates concepts from theology, anthropology and ethics. But his philosophy can be considered as being essentially a hopeful humanism, envisaging the possibility of human beings attaining a higher level of consciousness through their own efforts, adequate to ensure the future of the species. It draws on insights from Continental philosophy and Anglo-Saxon philosophy in a way which intends to overcome some deficiencies of previous liberal, socialist and other emancipatory philosophies, thus doing more justice to the complexity of human situations and the intersubjective meanings which people attach to their actions.

== See also ==
- Noosphere
- Jean-Paul Sartre
- Teilhard de Chardin
- Tony Blair
- Phenomenology
- Existentialism
- Paraconsistent logic
- Dialectics

== Writings ==
- The Tragic Finale: An Essay on the philosophy of Jean-Paul Sartre (1954)
- The Planetary Man, Vol. 1: A Noetic Prelude to a United World (1961)
- The Marxism of Jean-Paul Sartre (1965)
- The Planetary Man, Vol. 2: An Ethical Prelude to a United World (1972)
- The Planetary Man, Vol. 3: Let the future come: perspectives for a planetary peace (1987)
- "The Vitality and Power of Sartre", in The Review of Politics, Vol. 50, No. 2 (Spring, 1988), pp. 336–339
- "Beyond the Self in Sartre", in The Review of Politics, Vol. 46, No. 4 (Oct., 1984), pp. 635–637
- "Sartre the Individualist" and "An English version of Sartre's Main Philosophical Work: Critique of Dialectical Reason", in William L. McBride, Existentialist politics and political theory (1997)

== Quotation ==
"Only those who are genuinely able to rise above their own self-interest will ultimately command the respect of others. They will be revered as leaders. These are the people whose motives are believed in, who are admired and followed." — Wilfrid Desan, The Planetary Man (New York: Macmillan, 1972), 379.

== Sources ==
=== Commentaries ===
- R.M. Baird, "Wilfrid Desan's Vision of the New Man: Planetary Man", Philosophy Today, 1976, vol. 20, no3, pp. 235–242.
- J.J. Walter, "Wilfred Desan. The Planetary Man: Vols. I & II and Let the Future Come: Perspectives For Planetary Peace", in The Journal of Religion 69 (January, 1989): 135–136.
- P. J. Levesque, "Review of The Planetary Man. Vol. 3, Let the Future Come, by Wilfrid Desan". In Review of Metaphysics 42 (June 1989): 822–824.

=== Obituary ===
- J.B. Brough, "Wilfrid Desan, 1908-2001", by John B. Brough, Proceedings and Addresses of the American Philosophical Association, Vol. 75, No. 5 (May, 2002), pp. 189–190
