= Philippe Desan =

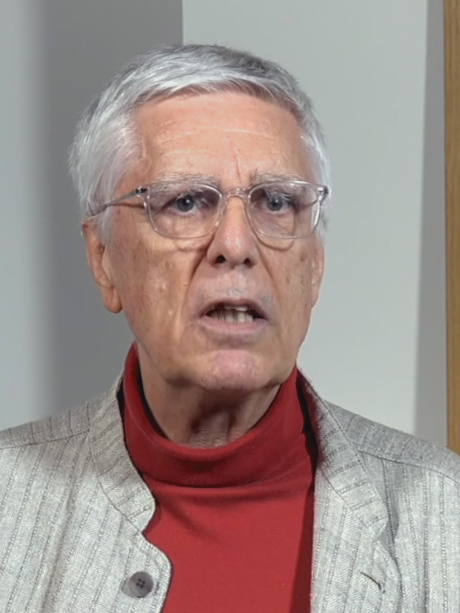
Philippe Dessan (2018)

Philippe Desan is Howard L. Willett Professor of French and History of Culture at the University of Chicago. Originally from France, Desan is among the top Montaigne scholars alive today. He received his PhD from the University of California Davis (1984), and has published widely on several topics pertaining to the literature and culture of the French Renaissance, often in relation to their economic, political and sociological context. At the University of Chicago, he has served as Master of the Humanities Collegiate Division and as Chair of the Department of Romance Languages and Literatures. He is the general editor of the Montaigne Studies. He has been awarded numerous honors for his scholarly work, including being named Knight of the Ordre des Palmes Académiques (1994) and awarded the Ordre National du Mérite (2004) and the Ordre des Arts et Lettres (2011). He has also received the Prix de l'Académie Française (for the Dictionnaire de Montaigne) in 2005, the Grand Prix de l'Académie Française for "le rayonnement de la langue et littérature française" in 2015 and the Prix de l'Académie des Sciences Morales et Politiques for his "Montaigne. Une biographie politique" in 2015.

== Bibliography ==
- Naissance de la méthode: Machiavel, La Ramée, Bodin, Montaigne, Descartes (Paris: A.-G. Nizet, 1987),
- Humanism in Crisis: The Decline of the French Renaissance, editor (Ann Arbor: University of Michigan Press, 1991),
- Les Commerces de Montaigne (Paris: A.-G. Nizet, 1992),
- Penser l'Histoire à la Renaissance (Paris: Editions Paradigme, 1993),
- Montaigne, les Cannibales et les Conquistadores (Paris: A.-G. Nizet, 1994),
- Literary Objects: Flaubert (Chicago, 1996),
- Montaigne dans tous ses états (Fasano: Schena Editore, 2001),
- Reproduction en quadrichromie de l’Exemplaire de Bordeaux des Essais de Montaigne (Chicago: Montaigne Studies, 2002),
- L'Imaginaire économique de la Renaissance (Paris: Presses de l'Université Paris-Sorbonne, 2002),
- Dictionnaire de Michel de Montaigne, editor (Paris: H. Champion, 2004, 2007),
- Reproduction fac-similé de l’édition de 1582 des Essais de Montaigne (Paris: Société des Textes Français Modernes, 2005),
- Montaigne politique, editor (Paris: H. Champion, 2006),
- Portraits à l'essai: iconographie de Montaigne (Paris: H. Champion, 2007).
- Montaigne. Les formes du monde et de l'esprit (Paris: Presses de l'Université Paris-Sorbonne, 2008).
- Dieu à nostre commerce et société: Montaigne et la théologie, editor (Geneva: Droz, 2008).
- Bibliotheca Desaniana. Catalogue Montaigne (Paris: Classiques Garnier, 2008).
- Les Chapitres oubliés des Essais, editor (Paris: H. Champion, 2011).
- Reproduction fac-similé de l’édition de 1774 du Journal de voyage de Montaigne (Paris: Société des Textes Français Modernes, 2014),
- Cités humanistes, cités politiques, editor with Denis Crouzet and Elisabeth Crouzet-Pavan (Paris: Presses de l'Université Paris-Sorbonne, 2014).
- Montaigne. Une biographie politique (Paris: Odile Jacob, 2014).
- Montaigne à l'étranger: voyages avérés, possibles et imaginés, editor (Paris: Classiques Garnier, 2016).
- Le Texte en scène. Littérature et théâtralité à la Renaissance, editor with Concetta Cavallini (Paris: Classiques Garnier, 2016).
- Lectures du Troisième Livre des Essais de Montaigne, editor (Paris: Champion Classiques, 2016).
- The Oxford Handbook of Montaigne, editor (New York, Oxford University Press, 2016).
- Scepticisme et pensée morale de Michel de Montaigne à Stanley Cavell, editor with Jean-Charles Darmon and Gianni Paganini (Paris: Hermann, 2017).
- Montaigne. A Life (Princeton: Princeton University Press, 2017).
- Les Biographies littéraires: théories, pratiques, et perspectives nouvelles, editor with Daniel Desormeaux (Paris: Classiques Garnier, 2018).
- Les Usages philosophiques de Montaigne du XVIe au XXIe siècle, editor (Paris: Hermann, 2018).
- Montaigne: penser le social (Paris: Odile Jacob, 2018).
- Montaigne: une rhétorique naturalisée, editor with Blandine Perona and Deborah Knop (Paris: H. Champion, 2019).
- L'Immoralité littéraire et ses juges, editor with Jean-Baptiste Amadieu and Jean-Charles Darmon (Paris: Hermann, 2019).
- L'Humanisme à l'épreuve de l'Europe (XVe-XVIe siècles). Histoire d'une transmutation culturelle, editor with Denis Crouzet, Elisabeth Crouzet-Pavan and Clémence Revest (Ceyzérieu: Champ Vallon, 2019).
- Editer les œuvres complètes (XVIe et XVIIe siècle), editor with Anne Régent-Susini (Paris: Société des Textes Français Modernes, 2020).
- Penser et agir à la Renaissance/Thought and Action in the Renaissance, editor with Véronique Ferrer (Geneva: Droz, 2020).
- Dix études sur Montaigne (Paris: Classiques Garnier, 2020).
- Montaigne et le social, editor (Paris: Hermann, 2022).
- La Modernité de Montaigne (Paris: Odile Jacob, 2022).
