= Philip & Son =

Philip & Son may refer to:

- Philip and Son, shipbuilders in Dartmouth, Devon, England
- George Philip and Son, cartographer and map publisher
