= John Francon Williams =

British writer, geographer, historian, journalist, cartographer and inventor

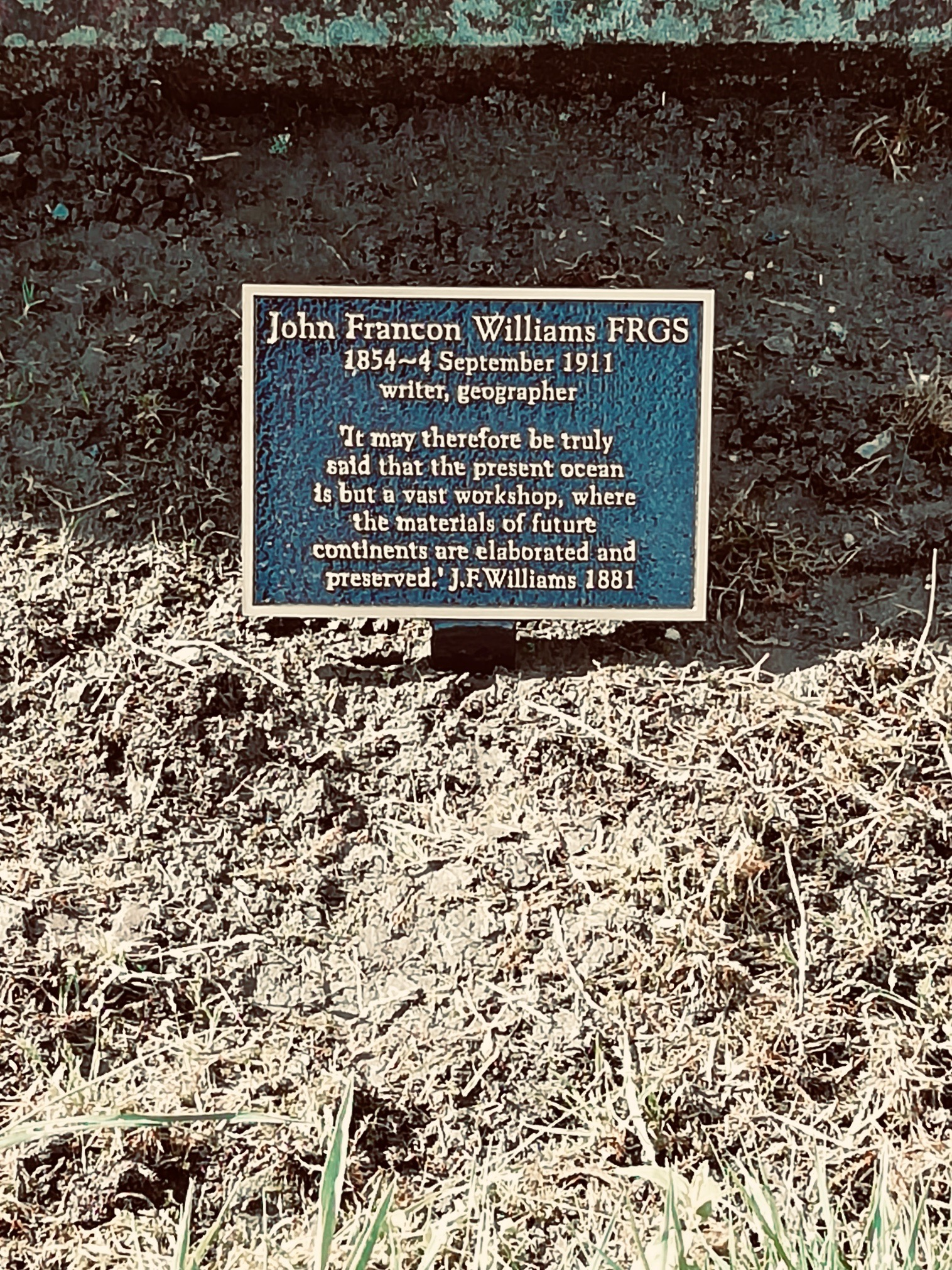
- Williams commemorative plaque
- Born: 1854; Llanllechid, Caernarvonshire, Wales
- Died: 4 September 1911 (aged 56–57); Alloa, Clackmannanshire, Scotland
- Occupations: Writer, geographer, historian, cartographer, journalist and inventor
- Spouse: Barbara Balmain Dougall
- Children: 5, including Aeneas Francon Williams and David Dougal Williams

John Francon Williams FRGS (1854 – 4 September 1911) was a British writer, geographer, historian, journalist, cartographer, and inventor, born in Llanllechid, Caernarvonshire. His seminal work was The Geography of the Oceans.

== Family ==
John Francon Williams was the second son of Richard Williams (b. 1818 Llanllechid) and his wife Mary (b. 1822 Denbighshire). Richard and Mary had two further sons, William (b. 1843) and Henry (b. 1858), and two daughters, Mary Jr. (b. 1857) and Grace (b. 1862). All the children were born in Llanllechid, North Wales. The Williams family first lived at Cenfaes Terrace and then, as the family grew larger, moved to a stone cottage at 5 Pencennant (Pen-y-ceunant), one of a row of traditional terraced stone cottages in Llanllechid, where all their immediate neighbours were also named Williams. The cottages positioned on a gentle slope had views directly overlooking the Ogwen Valley and the Snowdonian Mountains in the distance. Richard worked nearby as a slate quarryman (most probably) in Penrhyn Quarry located north of Bethesda overlooking the River Ogwen. The Quarry was owned and run by the wealthy Dawkins-Pennant family, who also owned Penrhyn Castle and most of the land in the area. Over time, Richard Williams was promoted to the role of 'Overlooker' (a term used in the 19th century for a superintendent or overseer) at the slate quarry.

During the next decade, an increase of population in the area occurred due to the extension of slate and stone quarrying. In the Imperial Gazetteer of England and Wales (published in 1870-2), Llanllechid is described as thus: "Llanllechid, a village, a parish, and a sub-district in Bangor district, Carnarvon. The village stands near the river Ogwen, 3½ miles SW by S of Aber r. station, and 3½ SE of Bangor; and has a post office under Bangor, and a fair on 29 October."

John and his two brothers and two sisters attended the local school, where John showed a particularly strong aptitude and interest in geography and history. By the mid-1870s, as a young adult, John moved away to Northampton, where he took up a post as a school teacher. It was in Northampton that John met his future wife, Barbara.

On 8 July 1876, John married Barbara Balmain Dougall at St Giles' Church, Northampton. The newlyweds first home was at Palmerston Road, Northampton. Over the succeeding years John and Barbara had five children: four sons; John Balmain, (b. 1877, Northampton), Aeneas Francon Williams (b. 1886, Liscard, Cheshire), David Dougal Williams (b. 1888, Liscard), and George Stanley (b. 14 April 1890, at Hope Place in the Georgian Quarter of Liverpool) – and one daughter; Margaret Mary Ann (b. 1891, Liscard.) George was baptised on 25 May 1890. During this period the family moved house frequently, residing at Hope Place, Liverpool, and in Liscard at 2 Massey Park, Wallasey, Chester, to remain close to Liverpool, where John had begun a career as a journalist and subsequent editor on a local Liverpool newspaper. During the early 1880s, John's sister Mary and his brother Henry left the Williams' family home in Llanllechid. Only John's sister Grace, who now had a career as a dressmaker, remained living with her parents at the family home. In 1885, Grace married Robert William Williams (1861–1931) in Bethesda, hence Grace and her future offspring retained the Williams surname.

In 1891, John's father, mother and a brother died (most probably due to the influenza epidemic that spread across Wales and Northern England), and in December that same year John and Barbara's young daughter Margaret Mary Ann Williams died and was buried on 30 December at Massey Park. In late 1891, Grace and Robert and their two young children, Robert Henry (b. 1886) and William John (b. 1888), emigrated to the USA, arriving in New York in January 1892. The family settled in Granville, Washington, New York.

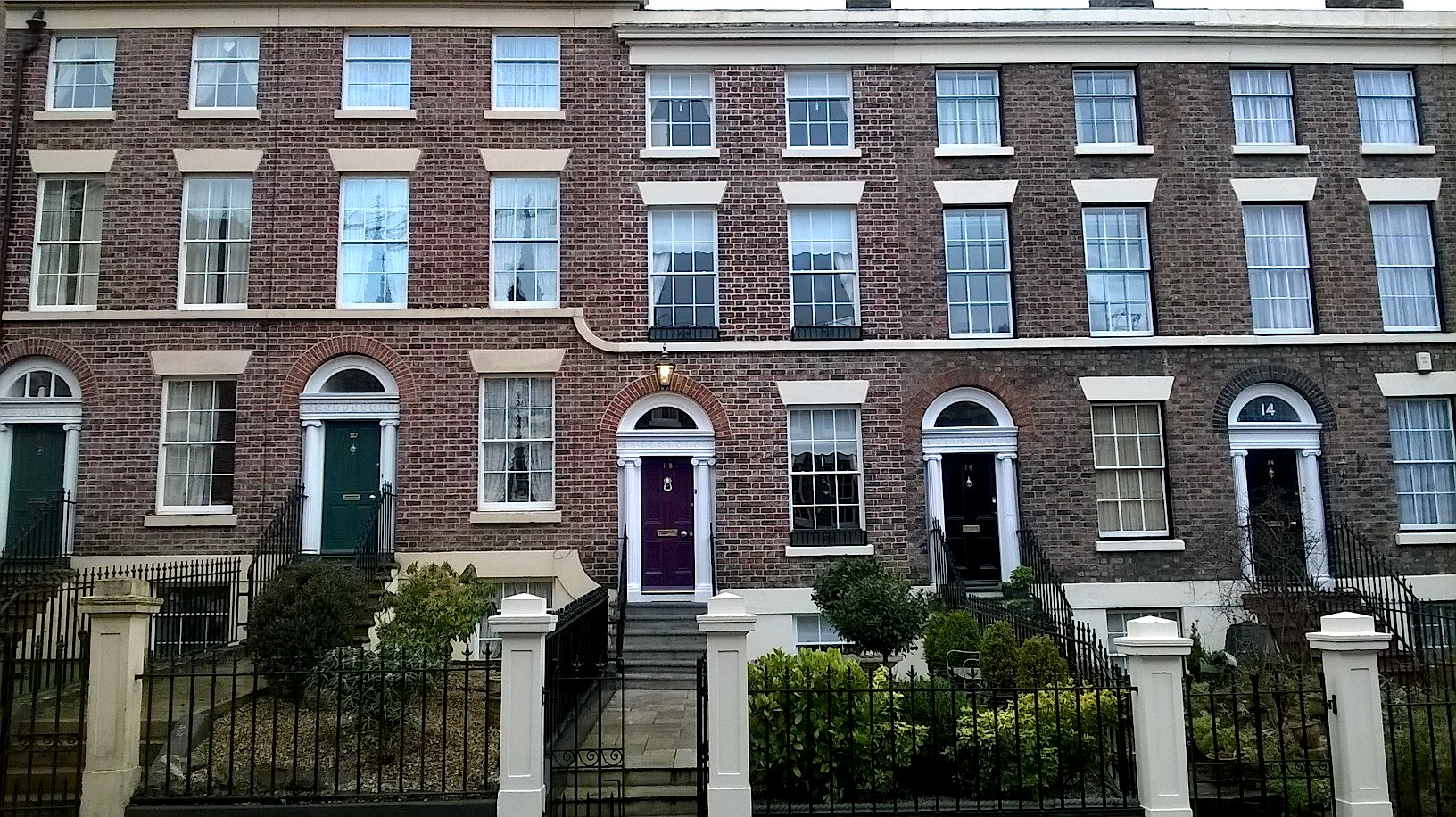
Hope Place, Liverpool, (Georgian townhouses)

Barbara Balmain Dougall was born in 1851 in Dunning, Perthshire. She was one of seven children (Aeneas, David, Margaret, Isabella, Ann, Mary, and Barbara) to John and Ann Dougall. John Dougall was a handloom weaver, and his wife Ann was a cotton winder. Though most of the Dougall children entered the weaving trade, Aeneas became a teacher.

== Career ==
=== Early career ===
John Francon Williams worked as a journalist and editor on various newspapers and journals in Liverpool. In 1876 Williams was elected a Fellow of the Royal Geographical Society.

=== Association with George Philip & Son ===
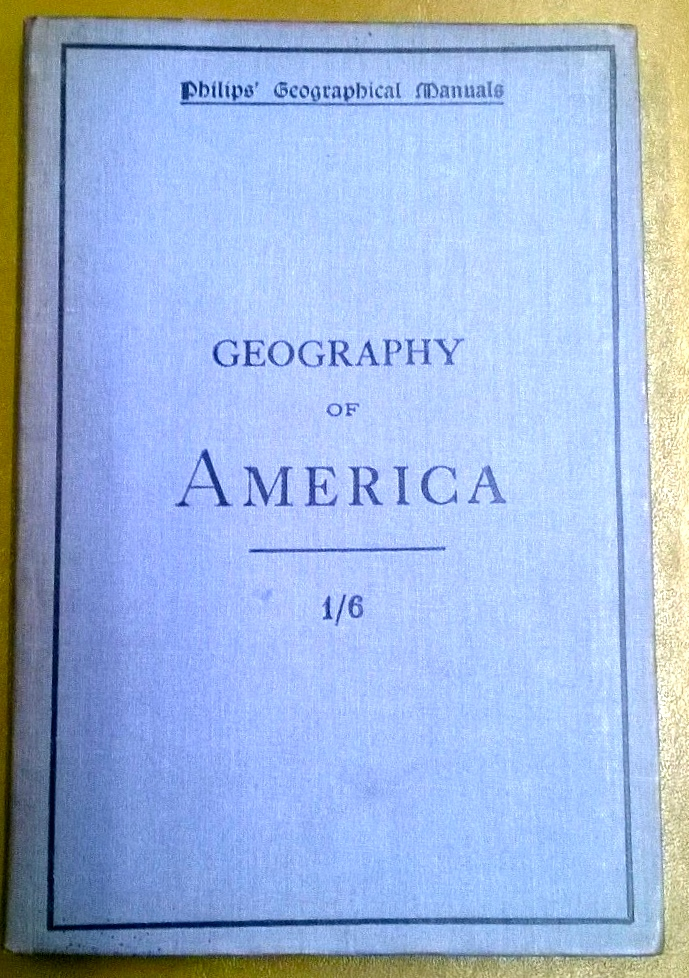
Geography of America by John Francon Williams

Williams started his publishing career in Liverpool under the guidance of the renowned cartographer and map publisher George Philip. George Philip & Son published maps and educational books, and in 1881 they published Williams's first book, A Class-Book of Modern Geography, with examination questions, notes & index. The book was written in collaboration with cartographer Professor William Hughes FRGS, and became the first publication in a successful run of works over the coming two decades by Williams for the publishing house George Philip & Son. Between 1881 and 1893, George Philip & Son published twelve English editions of A Class-Book of Modern Geography.

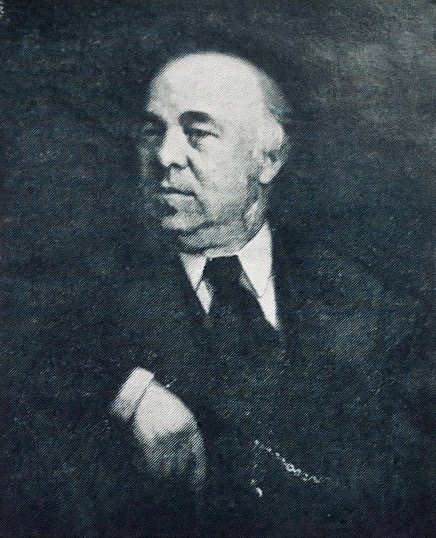
George Philip II (1823 - 1902)

George Philip (1800–1882) and his son George Philip II (1823–1902) ran George Philip & Son, and when George Philip Sr retired on 1 July 1879, his son George Philip II took control of the business. The publishing house produced geographical and educational publications and operated from Caxton Buildings in Liverpool, and 30–32 Fleet Street in London.

"Further expansion was prompted by the demand from board schools established after 1870 for general textbooks, school stationery and equipment, and specialist atlases and wall maps. The firm also supplied atlases and textbooks for many overseas countries in several languages." George Philip II spotted a gap in the market for quality school textbooks, and over the following two decades, Williams wrote and edited over forty books that were sold worldwide.

The Geography of the Oceans

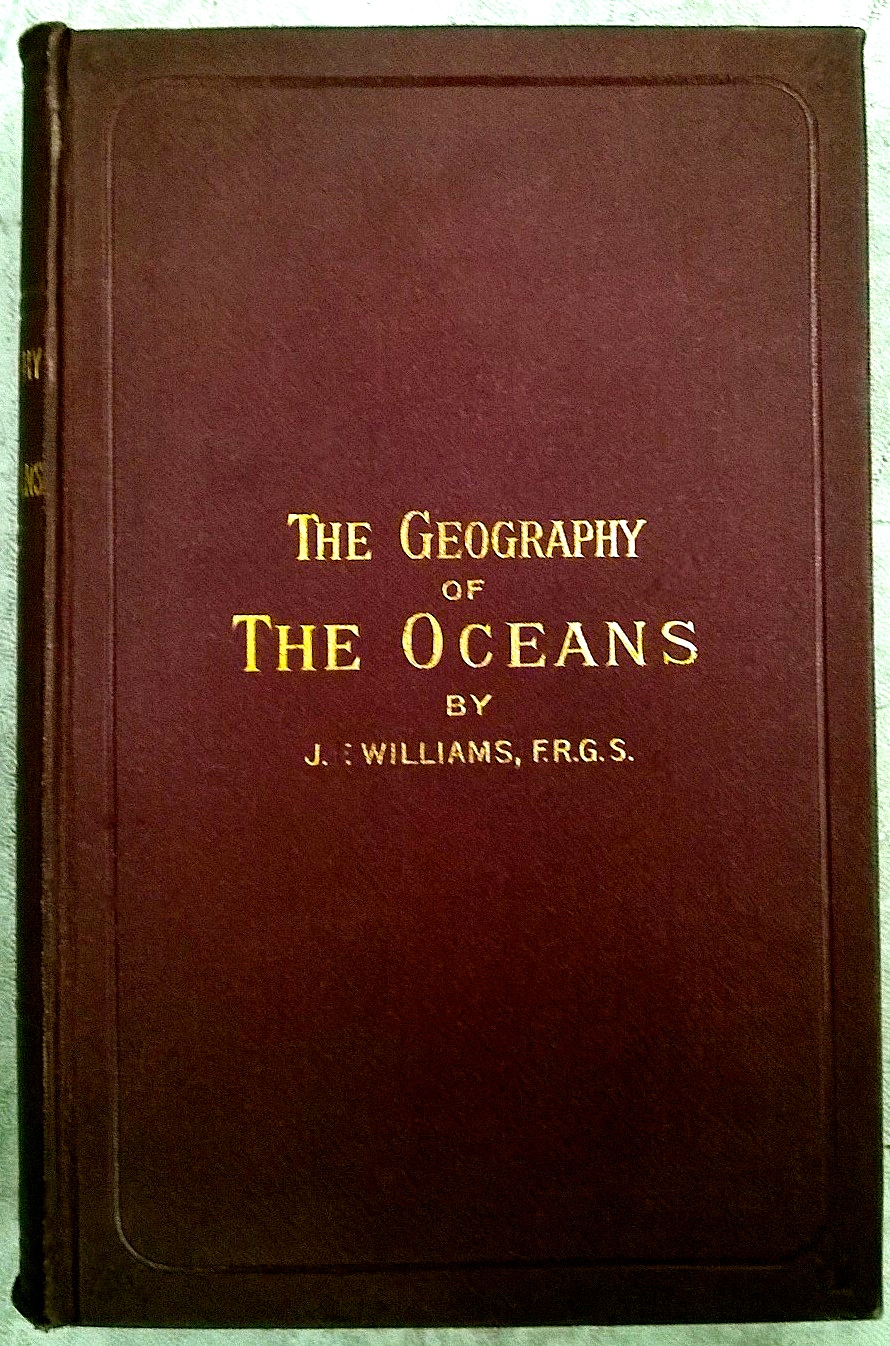
The Geography of the Oceans by John Francon Williams 1881

In 1881, Williams's seminal book The Geography of the Oceans was published.

"It may therefore be truly said that the present ocean is but a vast workshop, where the materials of future continents are elaborated and preserved."

— The Geography of the Oceans, John Francon Williams, 1881.

The Geography of the Oceans focuses on topics such as: General Geography of the Oceans, Physical Geography of the Oceans, the Geography of Particular Oceans. The various sections focus on: the distribution of land and water, oceanic river-systems, the salts of the sea, the density, colour and phosphorescence of the sea, distribution of marine life, temperature of the ocean, movements of the ocean, sidereal movements of tides, of the Atlantic, Pacific, Indian, Antarctic and the Arctic Ocean. It was the first book to cover with such intensity the geography of the oceans. 'A valuable little book entitled The Geography of the Oceans, which may be regarded almost as a new departure in geographical science,' claimed the book reviewer in The Cornish Telegraph, who continued, "I have found the book as fascinating as one of Jules Verne's novels." The Daily Gazette called it "A new geographical work of great importance."

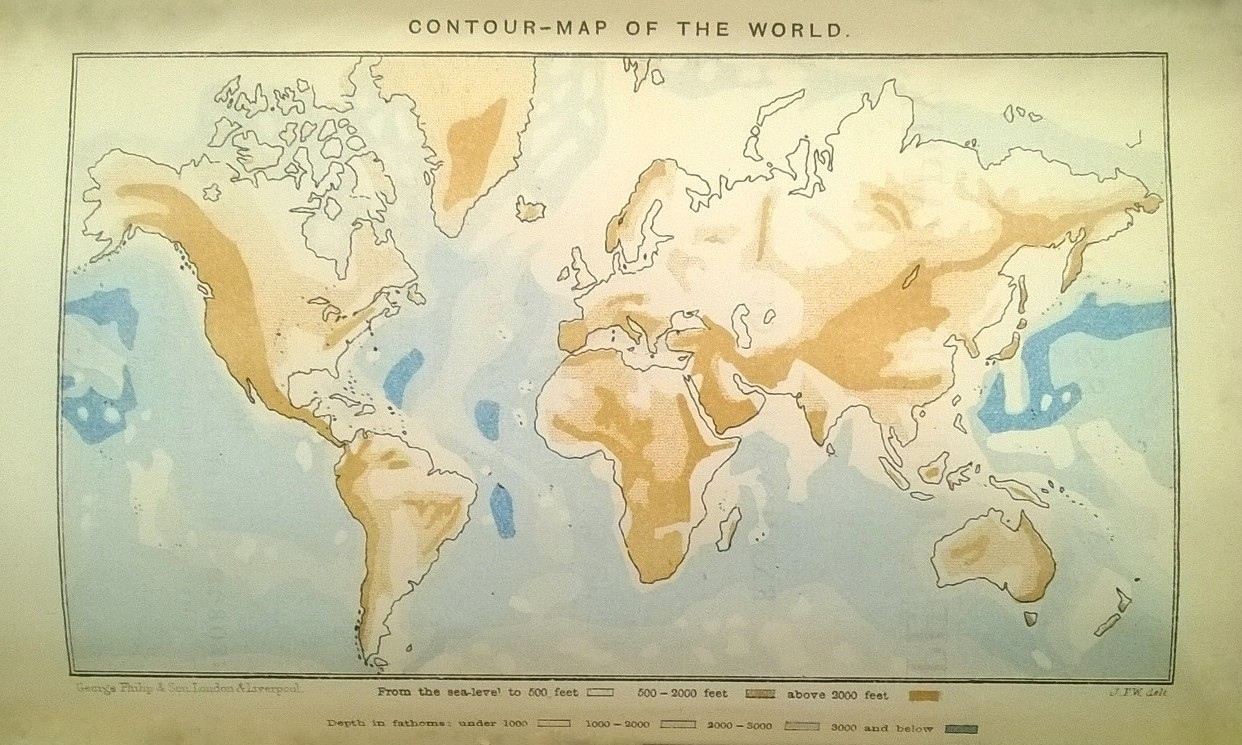
Contour Map of the World by J. Francon Williams 1881

In 1881, Williams and his family moved to West Derby in Lancashire, where they lived at 52 Bonsall Road.

In 1882, George Philip & Son published Philip's Series of Map-Drawing Books by John Francon Williams. Each book (of which there were at least 22 in the series) contained: (I) A complete full-coloured map, so attached as to be always available for copying; (II) An uncoloured map without the names, which the pupil can fill in as an introductory exercise; (III) An outline map, with coastline and lines of latitude and longitude only – the pupil being required to fill in the mountains, rivers, towns, etc. with the names: (VI) A map with lines of latitude and longitude only; (V) A blank sheet with the border of the map only. The books were issued in two sizes costing threepence and sixpence each. A review in the Practical Teacher (May 1882) of two books from the series, No. 2 England and Wales, and No. 22 Australia, maintained; ‘Williams has done a good service in publishing this series of Map-Drawing books. They will prove invaluable to the young learners and are well worth the consideration of every teacher of ‘Mapping.’’

George Philip & Son employed three in-house cartographers: John Bartholomew the elder, William Hughes, and August Petermann. They were regarded as Europe's finest cartographers. As well as being a good friend of John Bartholomew Jr., Williams was also a friend of the Scottish journalist and Sub-Editor of The Scotsman newspaper John Geddie. In June 1882, Williams and cartographer John Bartholomew Jr. nominated Geddie as a Fellow of the Royal Geographical Society. Williams was also acquainted with Edwin Ransom, owner of Kempston Mill, Bedford, who became Mayor of Bedford 1855–56 and was proprietor of the Bedfordshire Times 1872–79. Ransom nominated Williams as a Fellow of the Royal Geographical Society in March 1876.

Williams also tried his hand as an inventor. One of his inventions (of which there were two different designs) was a new spaced measuring rule or scale, registered and patented on 21 April 1884. The measuring rule was applicable in printing, painting, embossing, or similar. He also patented several other inventions including, ‘pencils with moveable leads’ and ‘pen-and-ink holders’ registered in 1883, ‘letter clips and files’ and additional ‘pencils with moveable leads’ registered in 1884, and ‘educational appliances’ in 1885

On 29 December 1885, John F. Williams attended the first annual children's Athletic Fete and Industrial Exhibition, held at the Liverpool Gymnasium in Myrtle Street under the auspices of the Liverpool Council of Education and School Board. Williams judged the Map Drawing category and the Penmanship category. Over 900 entries were received for the different groups, and George Philip & Son gifted many prizes of books and paint-boxes.

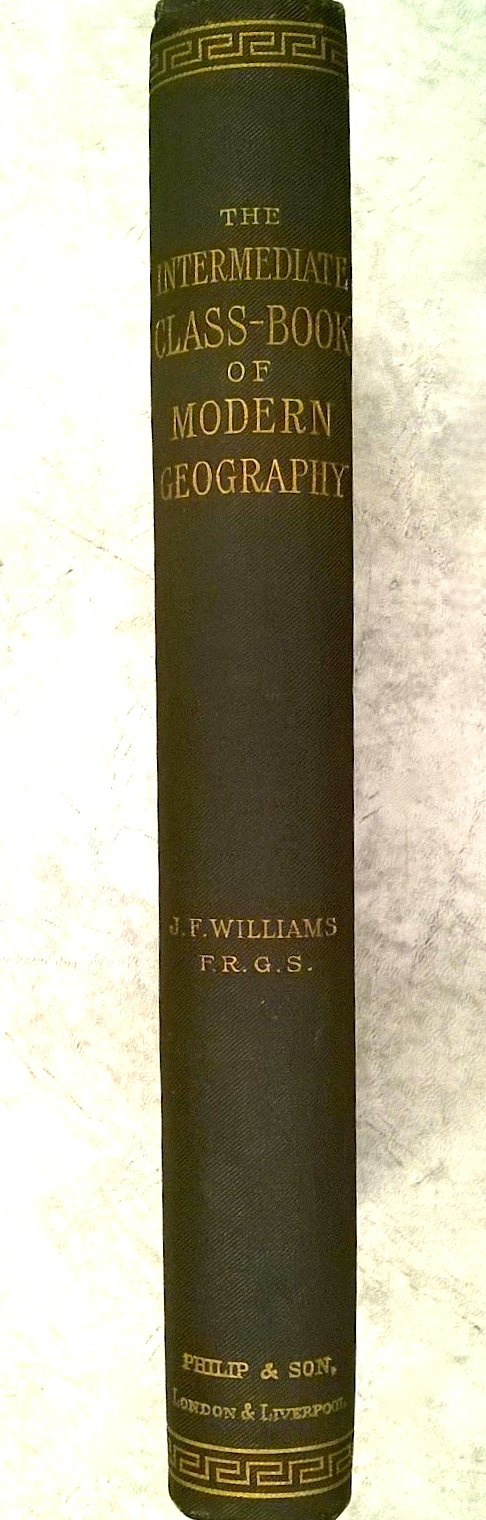
The Intermediate Class-Book of Modern Geography by John Francon Williams 1886

In 1887, Philips published Philip's Handy Volume Atlas of the World by William Hughes and John Francon Williams. The pocketbook contained 110 maps and plans all finely tinted, accompanied by statistical notes and other information. The Leeds Mercury said, "It would hardly be possible to find greater excellence in so convenient a form as we have in Philip's Handy Volume Atlas of the World." ‘The volume deserves to have a wide circulation,’ stated the Liverpool Mercury, and declared, "In fact, it is quite a little geographical library in itself." Williams dedicated the book to the president of the Royal Geographical Society, Lord Aberdare, Henry Austin Bruce, 1st Baron Aberdare. A glowing review of Philips' Handy Volume and Atlas of the World appeared in the West London Observer on Saturday 23 July 1887: "In days when the facilities of locomotion are such that everybody runs about the world, and the process of what popularly known as 'globe-trotting' goes on to an extraordinary extent and in a systematic manner, a comprehensive volume, small, compact, admirably arranged, clearly printed and well bound, and which can be carried in the pocket, like that published by Messrs. Philip & Son of Liverpool and London, is entitled to be regarded as a special boon. It contains more than a hundred maps with brief but succinct notes and a capital index. The different countries of the world are revealed in all essential particulars with luminous perspicacity. The maps are fine specimens of engraving, and the letterpress clear and distinct. The author is Mr. J. Francon Williams FRGS, and his name will be a sufficient guarantee for the correctness of the data furnished up to the period of publication. The production of this most useful work must have entailed a large outlay, but it cannot be doubted that, as it will supply a popular want, the sale will be enormous, and fully compensate the enterprising publishers for the cost and trouble incurred. We earnestly recommend the 'Handy Volume,' not alone to travellers, but to all who have occasion in connection with literary pursuits, or the prosecution of business, 'to survey mankind from China to Peru,' or over those wider districts, which a century ago were practically beyond even a poets pen."

In the late 1880s, Williams worked in conjunction with the publisher and editor George Newnes (Sir George Newnes, 1st Baronet) – now regarded as the founding father of popular journalism – during the years when Newnes was building his publishing empire. During this period, Williams began formulating ideas to start his own publication, which would not come to fruition until several years later.

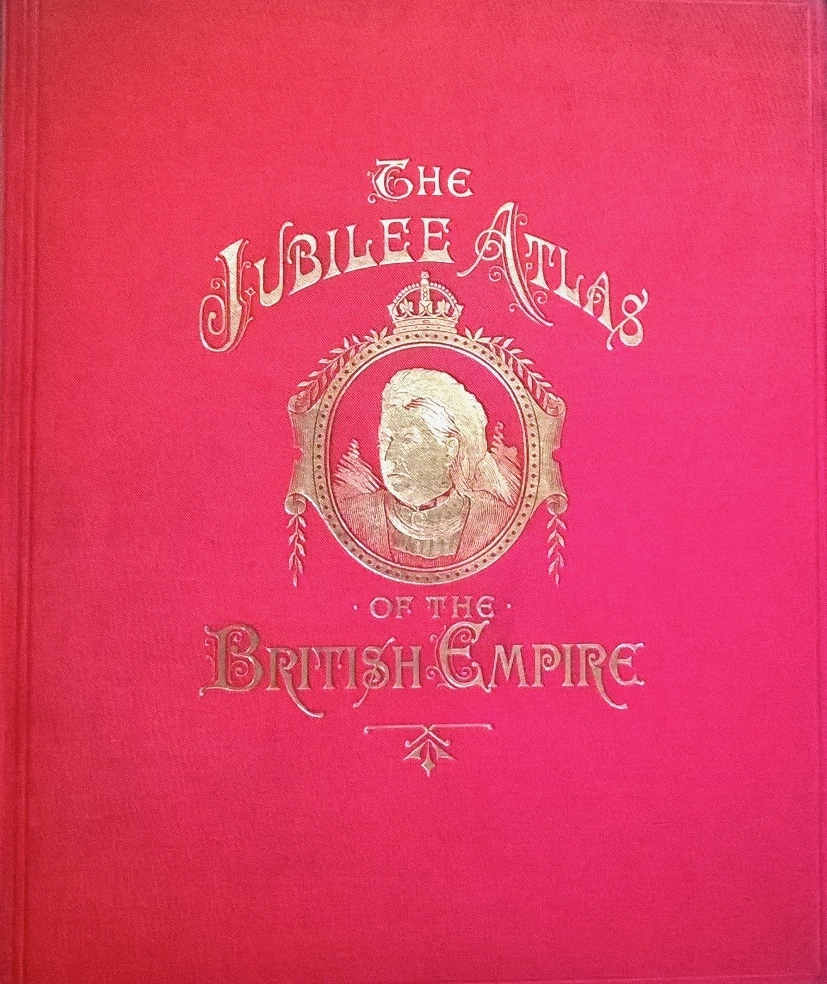
The Jubilee Atlas of the British Empire by John Francon Williams, published in 1887 to commemorate the Golden Jubilee of Queen Victoria

In 1888, Philips' published several geographical atlases they named 'Handy-Volumes' compiled and written by Williams that were distributed widely worldwide; ‘All these compact and clearly-printed miniature works, suitable for pocket or desk, and rightly named ‘Handy-Volumes’ are supplied with indexes, and geographical, statistical and historical notes, carefully gathered by Mr. J. Francon Williams FRGS.’

In America, John's history books were introduced into the school curriculum, where they remained for many years. Forever the businessman, on 4 July 1888, Williams wrote a letter from Liverpool to the politician and educator Hon. George William Ross in Toronto, Canada, in which Williams included as a gift a copy of his recently published Atlas of British America. Williams was hoping to break into the Canadian market. Ross was the Minister of Education for Ontario in the Liberal government of Sir Oliver Mowat and oversaw the purchase of schoolbooks for the province. In the letter, Williams writes, ‘Permit me to beg your kind acceptance of the accompanying copy of our little Atlas of British America, and also to ask you to examine it with a view to its authorization for use in the public schools and colleges of your province.’ In 1899, Ross became the Premier of Ontario. Whether Ross ordered a shipment of Atlas of British America is not documented, but Williams’ attraction to Canada appears to have commenced from around this period.

In November 1889, John Francon Williams was introduced to HRH Albert Edward, Prince of Wales. During their meeting, Williams presented the Prince of Wales with a copy of his 1887 book, Philips' Handy-volume Atlas of the British Empire. The book is housed in The Royal Collection Trust at Windsor Castle, with other John Francon Williams books.

"Maps are to geography what notation is to music."

— John Francon Williams, 1891.

On 15 December 1890, the Council of the London branch of the Froebel Society – (established in 1874 to teach and validate school examinations and teaching training courses at a kindergarten level, applying German educator Friedrich Fröbel’s methods) – passed a resolution to publish a new monthly journal titled Child Life, dedicated to kindergarten education. The first publication priced at threepence was issued in January 1891. John Francon Williams was one of the initial contributors to the journal writing articles in the January and February editions covering geography tutoring. In his articles, Williams emphasizes the importance of maps when studying geography and accents the necessity for children to learn the art of map reading. ‘Geography for all practical purposes of life is embodied in maps,’ and follows on by declaring, ‘Maps are to geography what notation is to music.’ He advises the prospective teacher that; ‘Every lesson must be thoughtfully and thoroughly prepared, and the more elementary the lesson, the greater, and really, the need for careful preparation. Not everyone is a born teacher, but everyone engaged in teaching may, by diligent study and perseverance, gain by art what he has not by nature, and no subject affords such opportunities for the exercise and display of skill in the art of teaching as geography.’ George Philip & Son were the appointed publishers of the journal, an association that continued until 1934, after which the Froebel Society published the journal in house. Original copies of Child Life are housed at the University of Roehampton, London, and can be accessed via their Froebel Archive Digital Collection. The journal is now viewed as a significant source of material regarding the influencing of kindergarten study and policymaking and for researchers interested in the Froebel Society and the Froebel Movement.

During 1891, Philip's issued a series of Map-Drawing Books titled, Philips’ Series of Map-Drawing Books, written and compiled by J. Francon Williams. A series of 24 books in two different editions were published; the Imperial at 13 in. by 11 in. priced at 6d, or the slightly smaller Crown edition at 10 in. by 8 in. priced at 3d. Each book contained a complete full-coloured map and an uncoloured map for the student to colour in and to complete names etc., an outline map with coastlines and lines of latitude and longitude, and a blank sheet with the border of only the map. The books allowed the student to draw the maps repeatedly. During the same year, Philip's also published an entirely new set of three Grammar School Atlases edited by Williams: Philip’s Grammar School Atlas No. 1, for preparatory students with 15 full-coloured maps, Philip’s Grammar School Atlas No. 2, for junior students with 30 full-coloured maps, and Philip’s Grammar School Atlas No. 3 for senior students containing 75 full-coloured maps. The atlases were referred to as ‘undoubtedly the finest examples of small atlases for ordinary school use ever issued.’

Also in 1891, Philip's published, Philips’ Picturesque History of England (with notes and three hundred illustrations and maps) by J. Francon Williams. The book retailed at 5s. A review in The Scotsman praised Williams for his ‘unflagging vivacity and narrative power. Incidents and characters are depicted in their true proportions.’ ‘The book is appropriately named in more ways than one. It tells the story of the English people – their growth, the development of their national institutions, the establishment of their worldwide empire, the achievements of their great monarchs, warriors, statesmen and writers, the social and economic conditions of the nation at various epochs. A distinctive feature of the work is the number and excellence of the illustrations.’

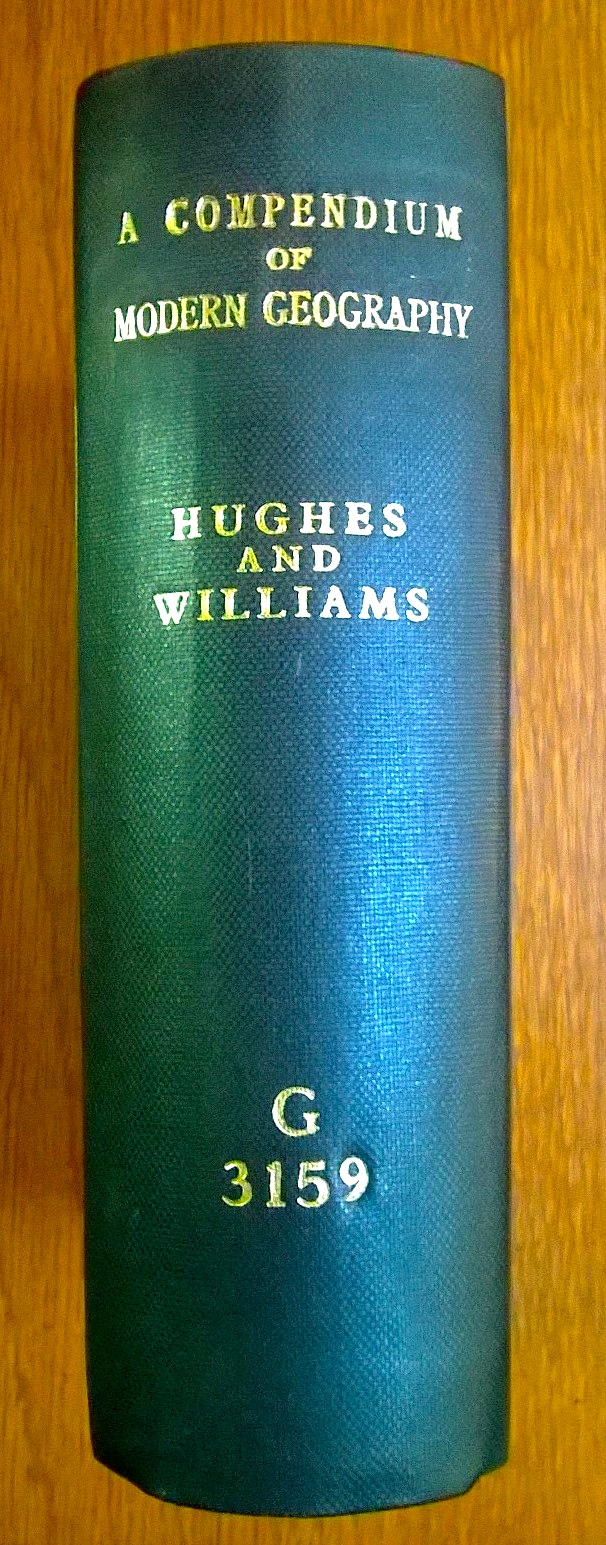
A Compendium of Modern Geography by William Hughes and J. Francon Williams, 1893, published by George Philip & Son, Liverpool & London

In 1893, George Philip & Son published the 866-page tome, A Compendium of Modern Geography – Physical – Political – Commercial, by William Hughes and John Francon Williams. Williams writes in the preface of the book, ‘This work, as the title implies, is designed for the use of advanced students, and also as a work of reference for those who are engaged in teaching geography.’ Compiling the book was a mammoth undertaking. ‘All the Countries of the World, as well as the Continents, are described in a sufficiently exhaustive manner to meet the requirements of almost all examinations in geography. Due prominence has been given to the Mountain and River Systems and other natural features; the present political condition of each State is indicated and, bearing in mind the fact the study of Commercial geography is daily becoming of greater importance, the Industry and Trade of the principal countries are dealt with in considerable detail.’ Williams goes on to assure the reader, 'In the preparation of this work the best and most recent British and foreign authorities have been consulted, and no pains have been spared to make the book a reliable exponent of the geographical knowledge of the present day.' Williams compiled, edited, and wrote the majority of the book as William Hughes had died seventeen years earlier in 1876.

In 1896, with Williams' increase in wealth, he moved his family yet again, this time to a freehold property in Mount Pleasant Road in Wallasey, which he named Balmain, after his wife, whose middle name was Balmain.

In the decade before the arrival of Pears' Cyclopaedia (1897), a much smaller work measuring 135 x 105 mm was available. It sold for sixpence in cloth, or one shilling in leather hardback, and was extremely popular, selling 800,000 copies by 1896. Eli Lemon Sheldon (pen-name Dom Lemon) compiled the book. Its success led its publisher to create a series of similar little books that sold equally well. Number 36 in the series was A World Gazetteer compiled by John Francon Williams. Williams' revised version had the same atlas, with slightly larger maps. George Philip & Son printed the book.

==== Stories Illustrated ====
In 1897, Williams founded and edited the monthly magazine Stories Illustrated. The magazine was published for seven months under Williams's ownership. In 1898, Stories Illustrated was purchased from Williams by Sir George Newnes, under circumstances that later caused John much anxiety after discovering the publication had been undervalued by Newnes to the sum of £30,000, the equivalent of which in 2019 would be almost £3.9 million. Williams launched his monthly magazine at the highly-competitive price of 3d, and in doing so undercut Newnes's monthly Strand Magazine costing sixpence, by half-price. A few months later, once Stories Illustrated was up and running, Williams increased its price to 3.1/2d. Being of a similar format to Strand Magazine, such competition irked Newnes and appears to have encouraged him to reach out and make Williams an offer to sell Stories Illustrated to him. Newnes had initially been inspired to create Strand Magazine in 1891 as a competitor to the successful American monthly Harper's Magazine, which had now made inroads into the British market. In publishing Strand Magazine, Newnes undercut Harper’s price by 50 per-cent. Each publisher undercut the other to get higher sales. For whatever reason, Williams accepted Newnes's offer to purchase Stories Illustrated. However, the deal later transpired not to be what Williams had been assured. Newnes had bought Stories Illustrated to expand his growing catalogue after the recent floatation of his company on the London Stock Exchange had netted him £1 million, the equivalent of which in 2019 would be over £128 million. The discrepancy of the £30,000 undervaluation of the magazine came to light after the deal was signed. As a result, a huge rift developed between Williams and Newnes. The matter was never resolved and led to a breakdown in friendship between the two men that lasted for the remainder of their lives.

=== Later career ===
By late 1898, the Williams family had moved yet again and were now living in a detached house Fairlight in Forest Avenue, Chingford, London.

In later life, John Francon Williams focused his career on being a Publishers Representative (Agent). He would travel to Edinburgh, Birmingham, Liverpool, Leicester, Manchester, London, and also abroad, primarily the United States and Canada, pursuing and securing contracts for publishing houses. One of the houses he acted for in Edinburgh was John Bartholomew and Son, which now belonged to his longtime friend, John George Bartholomew. Williams' eldest son John Jr. would accompany his father on some of these trips. John Jr. was noted as being a sickly child, "who is much troubled with asthma and bronchitis." In 1899, Williams's friend Sir Alfred Lewis Jones (a Liverpool ship-owner) of Messrs Elder, Dempster & Co., kindly gave Williams's son John Jr. a voyage on one of his steamers to New Orleans in the hope that it would help with his medical condition.

One of the prime reasons Williams travelled to the United States was to set up an Anglo-American Syndicate, which would help promote publishers, publishing houses, and their products. Williams discusses this matter in a handwritten letter to his friend John George Bartholomew. In it, he mentions his "unavoidable connection" with map-maker George Washington Bacon, with whom he is working with on several projects, both editorial and administrative, and hopes that his friend Sir Alfred Lewis Jones (the millionaire ship-owner) might be interested in becoming a financial partner in the syndicate. Williams was particularly keen to publish a Physical Atlas worldwide through the syndicate.

In 1899, Williams was commissioned by Mazawattee (publishers) to write a Gazetteer Pocket Atlas containing 9,000 to 10,000 places. Williams was also appointed by Alfred Harmsworth (later 1st Viscount Northcliffe), founder of the Harmsworth Magazine (later known as the London Magazine), to write a series of articles. His first article, published at the beginning of 1900, was entitled Then and Now: 1800–1900, Why This is the Most Wonderful Century in Time. The piece commemorated the advancement in engineering during the 19th century.

On 20 July 1900, Williams travelled to Boston, Massachusetts, from Liverpool aboard Winifredian.

=== Williams’ friendship with Theodore Roosevelt ===
A letter dated 6 May 1910 from Williams to Theodore Roosevelt, held at The Theodore Roosevelt Digital Library, explains the origins of their friendship. Roosevelt gave an address in late summer 1900 at Carnegie Hall, where he expressed regret at not having met geographer and writer John Francon Williams. Roosevelt had a great interest in geography. By coincidence, Williams was currently in New York City, having recently visited Boston. A meeting of the two was soon arranged through Roosevelt’s advisor, George B. Cortelyou. Williams and Roosevelt maintained their friendship throughout Roosevelt's presidency. Williams' 6 May 1910 letter was written while Roosevelt was travelling abroad on a sabbatical, and followed his visit to Kristiania for the Nobel Peace Prize Oration. Williams fears he will miss Roosevelt’s UK visit in a couple of weeks due to having suffered a minor stroke. Williams was in Manchester, convalescing, after recently returning from Naples. He notes Roosevelt’s enjoyment of his letter from Naples. Williams also mentions King Edward VII's serious illness. The King died later that evening. This informal letter underscores the significance of Roosevelt and Williams' friendship to Williams.

In 1901, by the time George Philip Jr. had retired from George Philip & Son, Williams had moved his family yet again, this time to 22 Queens Grove Road, Chingford, Essex. In December 1901, Williams sailed back to America on business. Upon his arrival, he travelled to Minnesota. At the beginning of January 1902, he visited Minneapolis and stayed as the guest of his cousin Daniel H. Williams at Daniel's home on Eleventh Street.

In late 1901/early 1902, the Williams family relocated to Clackmannan in Scotland, for Barbara to be closer to her sisters Ann and Margaret Dougall with whom they resided in Clackmannan at their home Mains House. Both of Barbara's sisters were spinsters and died within a few days of one another, Ann Dougall, on 17 March 1903 and Margaret Dougall three days later on 20 March 1903 (one day after her sister's funeral and burial). The sisters are buried next to each other in the old cemetery in Clackmannan. The sister's brother Aeneas Dougall (who died on 24 March 1897), is also buried there.

On 19 March 1904, Williams departed from Liverpool aboard SS Etruria bound for America on yet another business trip as a representative for various publishing houses. Seven days later, he arrived in New York City from where he travelled to several destinations.

In 1906, Williams devised a ‘self-educator Atlas.’ He greatly enthuses about it in a letter dated 31 October 1906 to his friend in Edinburgh cartographer John George Bartholomew. From the manner John writes, one assumes Bartholomew has agreed to produce the maps for the publication. Williams talks of submitting the project to George Philip & Son publishing house, hoping they might publish it. He also mentions an alternative publisher C. Arthur Pearson Ltd., to send it to as a ‘second’ placing as he knows C. Arthur Pearson and his managing partner Peter Keary. His concerns regarding the copyright of the ‘self-educator Atlas’ have prompted Williams to confide in his friend that he intends to have his idea patented; ‘I wouldn’t dream of ever suggesting anything of the kind, but these huge administrative houses have the idea-absorption propensity so strongly developed that every possible means of legitimate protection is fully justified.’ In John's role as an agent for Bartholomew's, he mentions in the same letter, ‘I will at the same time see Mr. Selfridge personally and show him the London & Regions maps of England & Wales.’ Wealthy businessman Harry Gordon Selfridge was visiting the UK on a trip from Chicago.

John's wife Barbara died in Clackmannan on 24 November 1909 at the family home Mains House. She is buried alongside her sisters and brother in the old cemetery in Clackmannan. She died from cancer of the liver.

=== The Hawes Junction rail crash ===
On Christmas Eve, 24 December 1910, the overnight express train from London St Pancras to Glasgow departed at midnight. The train consisted of four timber-bodied coaches, two sleeping cars and two brake vans, and a locomotive. John Francon Williams and his eldest son John Williams Jr. happened to be in Manchester attending to publishing business on 24 December and had arranged to spend Christmas Day with relatives and friends in Clackmannan in the Central Lowlands of Scotland. They decided to catch the overnight express train at Manchester, so that they could enjoy Christmas festivities in Clackmannan.

At 19 minutes to six in the morning, close to Hawes Junction, the express train travelling at high speed smashed into an oncoming locomotive. The express train concertina'd and careered off the tracks. Except for two electrically lit sleeping cars, the coaches' lighting was by the Pintsch oil gas system. The impact broke the gas pipe in one of the front carriages, and an explosion followed. Fire spread quickly through the wooden carriages killing twelve trapped and injured passengers.

The Dundee Courier on Tuesday 27 December in their coverage of the Hawes Junction rail crash reported: The news of the disaster occasioned considerable anxiety to the relatives of Mr. John Francon Williams, a prominent and highly-respected resident of Clackmannan. Mr. Williams and his eldest son Mr. John Williams, were in business in Manchester and had sent word to their friends in Clackmannan that they intended to travel North with the night express so as to arrive home on Saturday morning for Christmas. The fact that they did not put in an appearance in Clackmannan on Saturday, coupled with the news of the disaster, naturally aroused fears for their safety in the minds of their waiting relatives. Telegraphic communication was opened up with the hotel in Manchester where Mr. Williams had been staying, and yesterday (26 December) it was ascertained that, though the father and son had fully intended travelling with the ill-fated express, through pressure of business they had been compelled to postpone their departure till Monday evening, an arrangement, which, in the light of what subsequently occurred, may be regarded as providential.

== Later life ==
By 1911 John's landscape had changed dramatically. He was now boarding at 25 St Stephen's Road, Leicester, with the Grimsley family; widow Fanny Grimsley and her three unmarried daughters, Eliza aged 37, Jane aged 25, and Martha aged 21. Also boarding at the handsome 7-roomed property were four female lodgers. John was at this point in his career a Publishers Representative (agent) and still traveling extensively.

John Francon Williams died from a brain haemorrhage on 4 September 1911 in the County Hospital, Alloa, and is buried in an unmarked grave beside his wife in Clackmannan Cemetery in Clackmannanshire, Scotland. He is identified as having had 42 published works in 79 publications in the World Catalogue (WorldCat).

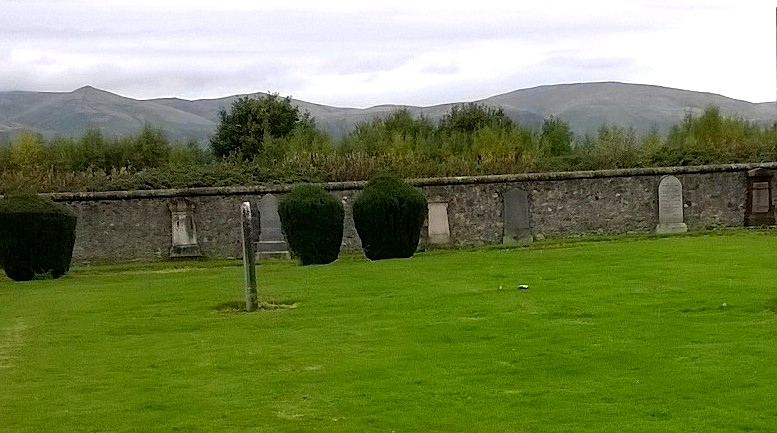
Clackmannan Cemetery

During World War I, John Francon Williams' eldest son, John Balmain Williams, now an artist, enlisted in the Royal Scots (Lothian Regiment) 12th Battalion and was killed in action on 25 April 1918 at the 2nd Battle of Kemmel at Lagache Farm, west of Wytschaete in Flanders, Belgium, along with 100 men of the 12th Battalion Royal Scots. John B. Williams is remembered in the Roll of Honour at the Royal Scots Memorial in the Hall of Honour at The Scottish National War Memorial located in Edinburgh Castle, Edinburgh, and at Tyne Cot Cemetery and Memorial located at West Flanders, in Belgium.

John Francon Williams is also the father of George Stanley Williams, musician and organist in the Chapel of the Inner Temple (Law Courts) in London, (died 23 July 1954, Dundee District, Angus, Scotland), Aeneas Francon Williams (missionary, chaplain, writer, poet), and David Dougal Williams (artist and art teacher), and the great-grandfather of writer Iain Cameron Williams.

== Commemorative Plaque, 2019 ==
On 4 September 2019, the 108th anniversary of John Francon Williams passing, a commemorative plaque was placed on his lair at Clackmannan Cemetery, Clackmannan. The brass plaque is inscribed:

John Francon Williams FRGS, 1854 – 4 September 1911, writer, geographer ‘It may therefore be truly said that the present ocean is but a vast workshop, where the materials of future continents are elaborated and preserved.’ J.F. Williams 1881

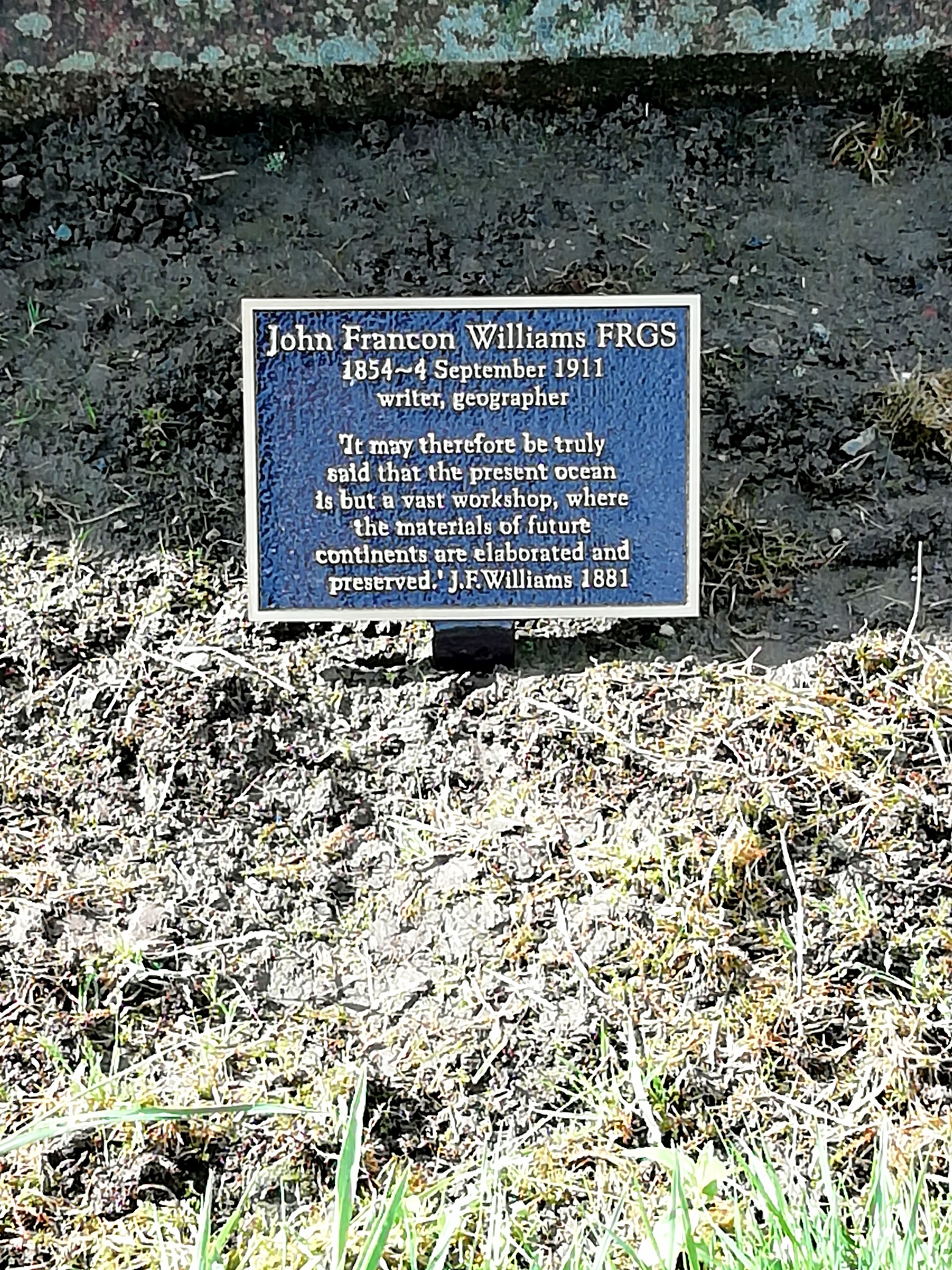
John Francon Williams FRGS plaque, Clackmannan Cemetery

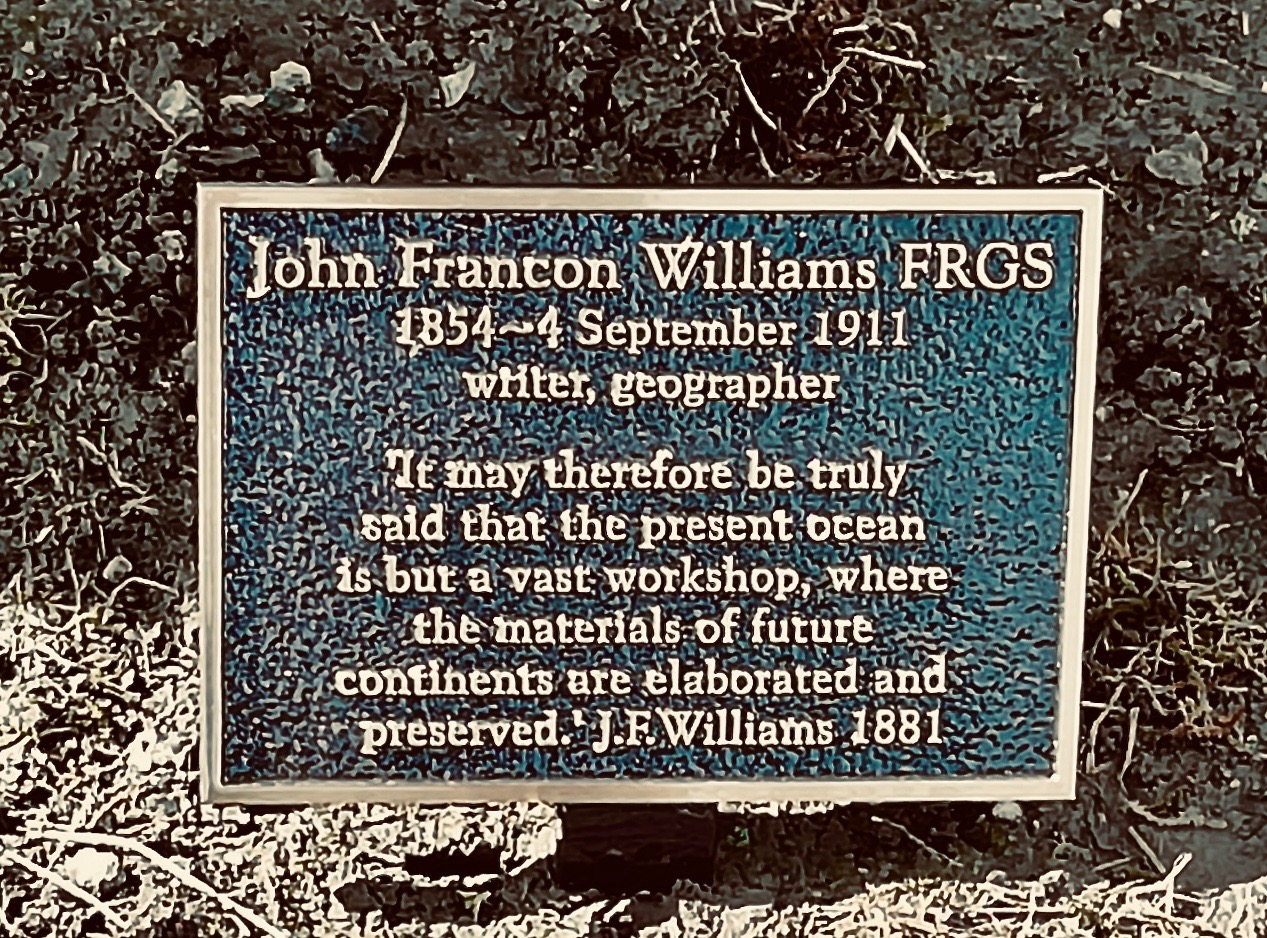
John Francon Williams FRGS commemorative plaque, Clackmannan Cemetery 2019

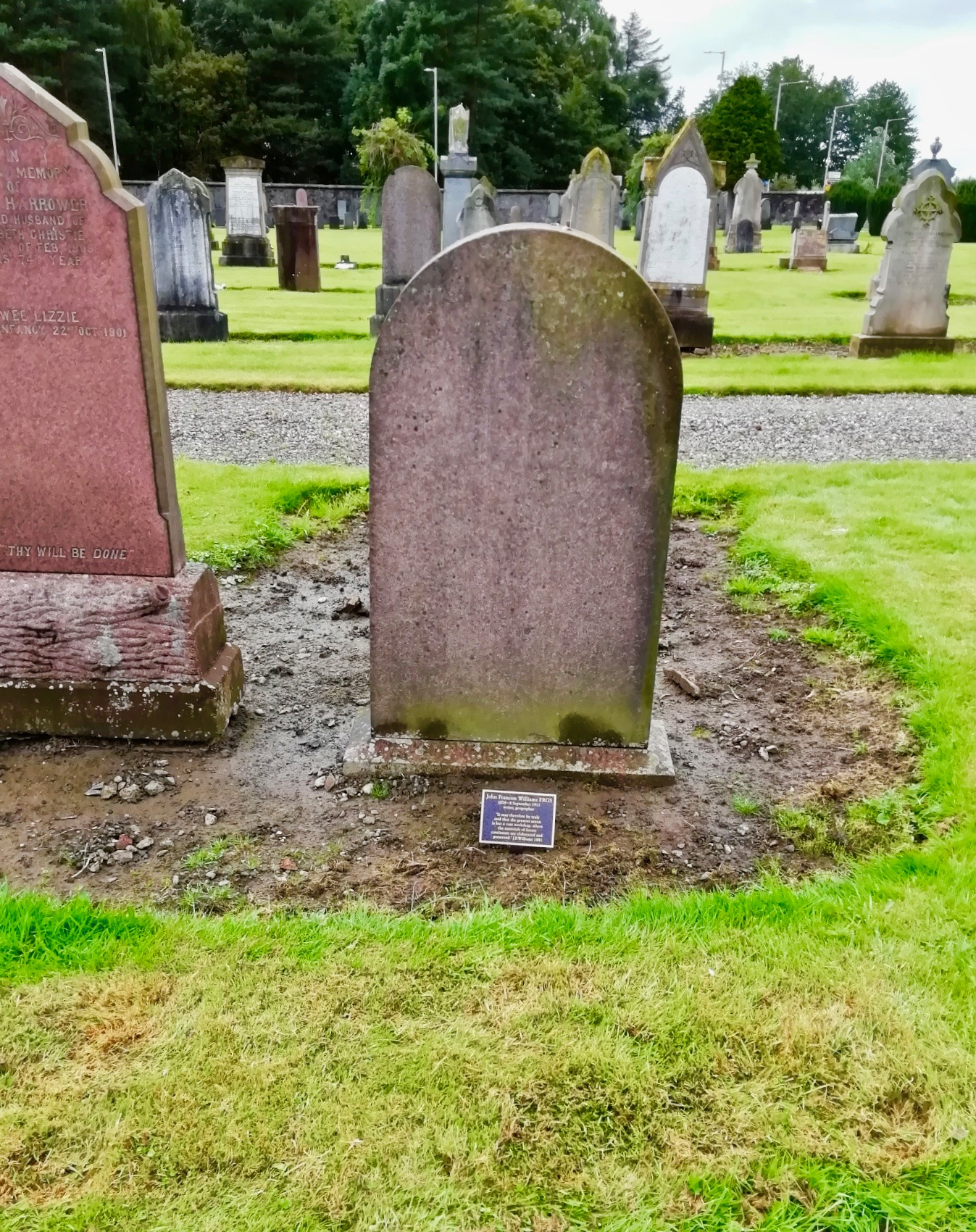
John Francon Williams FRGS lair and commemorative plaque, Clackmannan Cemetery, 2019

== Williams's family ==
In 1885, John Francon Williams' sister Grace Williams (b. 1862) married Welsh-born Robert William Williams (1861–1931) in Bethesda, North Wales, hence Grace and her children retained the Williams surname. In late 1891, Grace and Robert and their two young children, Robert Henry (b. 1886) and William John (b. 1888), emigrated to the United States and arrived in New York City in January 1892. The family settled in Granville, Washington, New York. Robert worked as a slate quarryman. Grace and Robert went on to have five more children all born in America: John Francon (1893–1974, named after her brother) who became a Head Baker, Mary (b. 1896), Jean (b. 1897), Robert C. (b. 1901) and Jane (b. 1906). Jane Williams married Edward Burton Hughes (1905 – 6 June 1987), who became the Acting Commissioner of New York State Department of Transportation. In the mid-1910s, Robert Henry Williams became a reporter in Lynn, Massachusetts, and an assistant editor on the Lynn Daily Item. During the 1920s, he was a reporter on the Lynn Telegram News. Another relative of John Francon Williams (his nephew via John’s Uncle Henry who had emigrated to New Zealand) was named John Francon Williams in John's honour. This John Francon Williams qualified as a dentist in New Zealand, where he became eminent in the dentistry profession and a published writer of many books. Dr. J. Francon Williams was a member of the Royal Society of Health and became the president of the New Zealand Dental Association from 1972 to 1973. Dr. Williams was well known for his part in the development of Dental Services in the South Pacific, especially on the island of Niue, where the dental service is based upon his famous 1968 Dental Report.

== Published works ==
(The list is by no means comprehensive.)

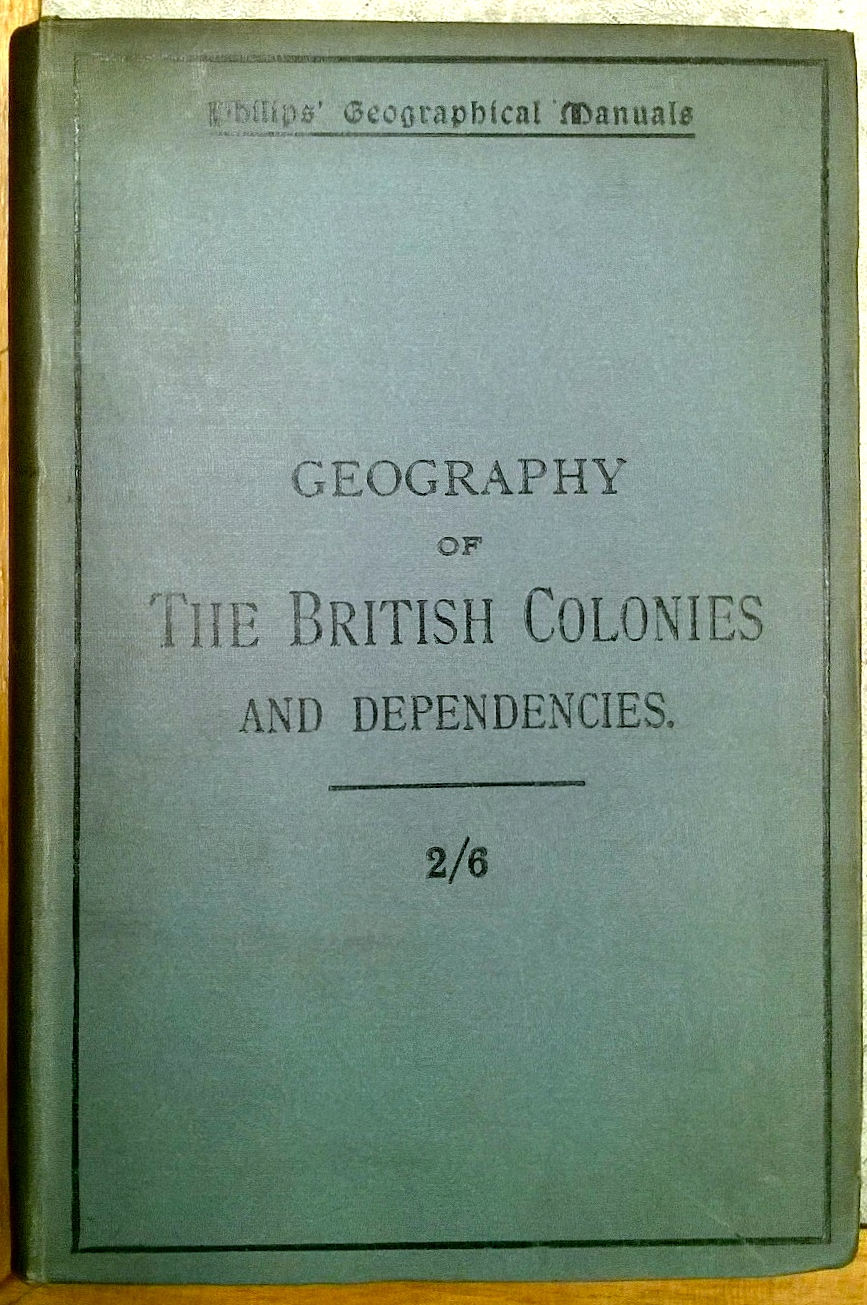
Geography of the British Colonies and Dependencies by John Francon Williams, 1892

- A Class-Book of Modern Geography, (with examination questions, notes, & index, by William Hughes and J. Francon Williams – publ. George Philip & Son, 1881. 12 editions were published in English between 1881 and 1893.
- The Geography of the Oceans by John Francon Williams – publ. George Philip & Son, 1881. 2 editions in English were published in 1881.
- Elementary Class-Book of Modern Geography by William Hughes and J. Francon Williams – George Philip & Son, 1882. 2 editions in English were published in 1882 and 1888.
- Philip’s Series of Map-Drawing Books by J. Francon Williams – publ. George Philip & Son (1882).
- A Class-Book of Physical Geography by William Hughes and J. Francon Williams – George Philip & Son, 1882. 7 editions in English published between 1882 and 1891.
- Philip's Elementary Atlas and Geography, containing 30 coloured maps, edited by J. Francon Williams – George Philip & Son, 1882.
- Stories From English History by John Francon Williams – George Philip & Son, 1884.
- Philip’s Picturesque History of England, with illustrations and maps, by John Francon Williams – George Philip & Son, 1884.
- Modern England: from the Ascension of James I to the Present Time, by John Francon Williams – George Philip & Son, 1884.
- Early England by John Francon Williams and John C. Crowley – Boston School Supply Co., 1884.
- Middle England: from the Accession of Henry II to the Death of Elizabeth by John Francon Williams and John C. Crowley – publ. Boston School Supply Co., 1884. 2 editions in English were published in 1884.
- Stories From English History by John Francon Williams and John C. Crowley – Boston School Supply Company, 1884.
- A Class-Book of Modern Geography with examination questions, by William Hughes and J. Francon Williams – publ. George Philip & Son, 1885.
- The Intermediate Class-Book of Modern Geography by J. Francon Williams – George Philip & Son, 1886.
- Philip's Elementary Atlas and Geography, containing the Essentials of the Geography of the World, and Thirty Coloured Maps, edited by J. Francon Williams – George Philip & Son, London, 1886.
- Philips Picturesque History of England by J. Francon Williams – publ. George Philip & Son, London, 1886.

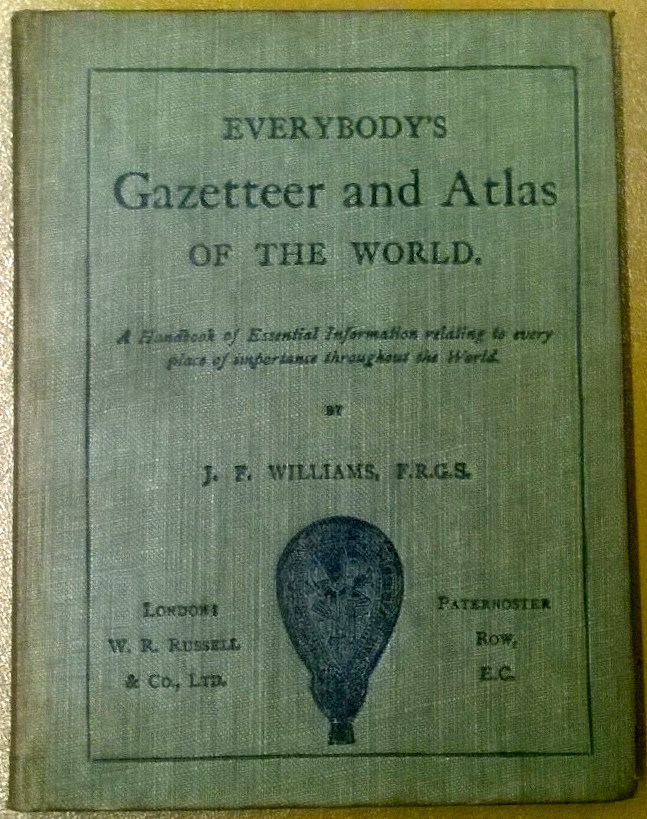
Everybody's Gazetteer and Atlas of the World by John Francon Williams, published 1900

- A Class-Book of Modern Geography, new and enlarged edition by William Hughes and J. Francon Williams – George Philip & Son, London, 1887. 2 editions in English published in 1887.
- The Queen's Jubilee Atlas of the British Empire by John Francon Williams – George Philip & Son, London, 1887. 3 editions in English published in 1887.
- Elementary Class-Book of Physical Geography, new revised edition by William Hughes and J. Francon Williams – George Philip & Son, London, 1887.
- The Queen's Jubilee Atlas of the British Empire, with descriptive and historical notes and statistical tables, by John Francon Williams – George Philip & Son, London, 1887. 2 English editions published in 1887.
- Philip's Handy-Volume Atlas of the British Empire compiled and edited by J. Francon Williams – George Philip & Son, 1887. (Several editions).
- Philip's Handy Volume Atlas of the World compiled and edited by J. Francon Williams, dedicated to the president of the Royal Geographical Society, Lord Aberdare – George Philip & Son, 1887.
- A Class-Book of Physical Geography, new and improved edition, by William Hughes and J. Francon Williams – George Philip & Son, London, 1888. 5 English editions published between 1888 and 1891.
- Philip's Handy-Volume Atlas of British America, with geographical, statistical and historical notes by J. Francon Williams – George Philip & Son, 1888.
- Philips’ Handy Volume Atlas of Australasia by J. Francon Williams – George Philip & Son, 1888.

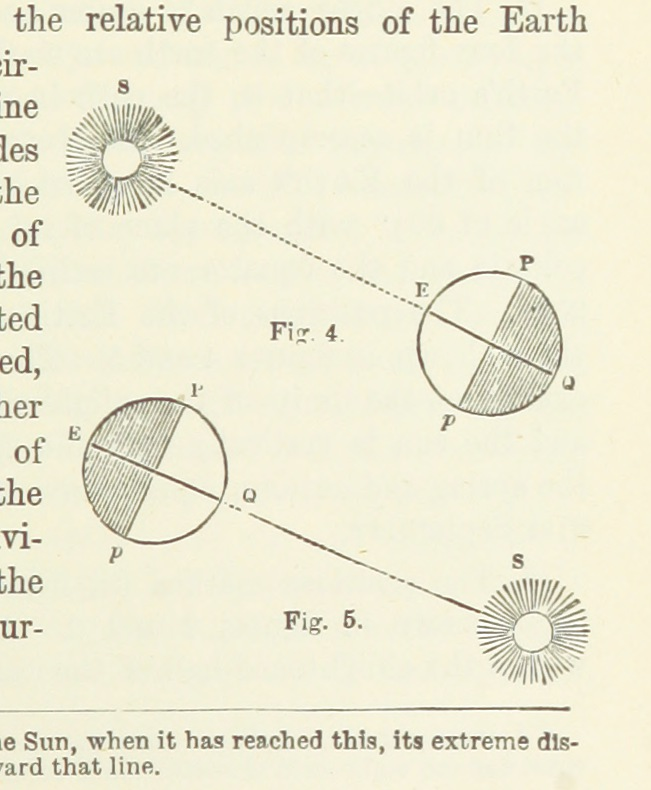
Image taken from page 25 of 'A Class-Book of Physical Geography ... New and improved edition, revised by J. Francon Williams' (11122315735)

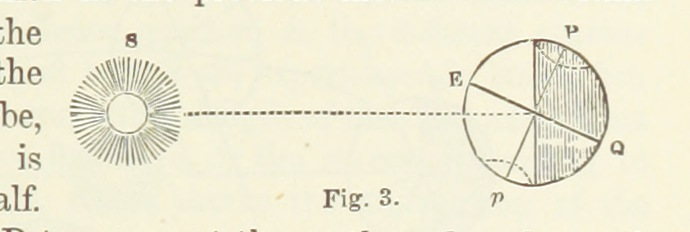
Image taken from page 25 of 'A Class-Book of Physical Geography ... New and improved edition, revised by J. Francon Williams' (11120476483)

- Childs Atlas, edited by J. Francon Williams – George Philip & Son, 1890.
- Philip's Presentation Atlas for Young People, edited by J. Francon Williams – George Philip & Son, 1890.
- Young Geographer's Pocket Atlas of the World, edited by J. Francon Williams – George Philip & Son, 1890.
- Philips’ Graphic School Atlas by J. Francon Williams – George Philip & Son, 1890
- Realistic Geography by J. Francon Williams – George Philip and Son, 1891.
- Philips’ Picturesque History of England (with notes and three hundred illustrations and maps) by J. Francon Williams – George Philip & Son, 1891.
- The Geography of the British Colonies and Dependencies, physical and political by J. Francon Williams – George Philip & Son, London, 1892. 4 English editions published between 1892 and 1907. 2 English editions published in 1892 and 1907.
- The Advanced Class-book of Modern Geography, Physical, Political, Commercial by J. Francon Williams and William Hughes – George Philip & Son, London, 1892. 3 English editions published in 1892, 1908 and 1910.
- Class-Book of Modern Geography by William Hughes and J. Francon Williams – George Philip & Son, 1892.
- Geography of Australasia and Polynesia by J. Francon Williams – George Philip & Son, 1892.
- A Compendium of Modern Geography by William Hughes and John Francon Williams – George Philip & Son, London & Liverpool, 1893. 3 English editions published in 1893.
- An Elementary Class-Book of Modern Geography, with examination questions, by William Hughes and J. Francon Williams – George Philip & Son, London, 1893.
- An Introduction to the Study of Geography by William Hughes and J. Francon Williams – George Philip & Son, 1893.
- Philips Graphic School Atlas, (series of 110 maps and diagrams) by J. Francon Williams – George Philip & Son, 1895.
- The Geography of the British Isles, Physical, Political, Commercial by William Hughes and J. Francon Williams – George Philip & Son, 1895.
- The Geography of Africa, Physical, Political and Commercial, by W. Hughes and J. Francon Williams – George Philip & Son, 1896.
- Philips’ Geographical Manuals with Maps and Diagrams by W. Hughes and J. Francon Williams – George Philip & Son, 1897.
- Pocket Gazetteer and Atlas of the World edited by J. Francon Williams, ‘Saxon’s Everybody’s Series,’ – Messrs. W.R. Russell & Co, 1899.
- Everybody's Gazetteer and Atlas of the World by John Francon Williams – W. R. Russell & Co., London, 1900 & 1910
- Geography of America by William Hughes and J. Francon Williams – Philips' Geographical Manuals – George Philip & Son, 1906.
- The Geography of the British Colonies and Dependencies: Physical–Political–Commercial by William Hughes and J. Francon Williams (new and revised edition) – George Philip and Son, London, 1907.
- The Story of Alfred the Great for Young Folks by John Francon Williams – George Philip & Son, London (2012 Kindle edition)
