= David Dougal Williams =

British painter (1888–1944)

David Dougal Williams FRSA
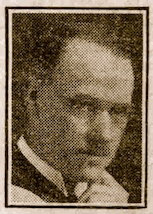
- Born: 1888; Liscard, Cheshire, England
- Died: 27 September 1944 (aged 55–56); Dundee, Scotland
- Education: Edinburgh University, Edinburgh College of Art, Moray House Training College
- Known for: Painting
- Parent: John Francon Williams (father)
- Relatives: Aeneas Francon Williams (brother)

David Dougall Williams FRSA (June 1888 – 27 September 1944) was a British artist and art teacher.

== Early years ==
David Dougall Williams was born in 1888 in Liscard, Cheshire, the third son of four to Barbara Balmain Dougall and her husband, writer and geographer John Francon Williams. He was baptized on 22 July 1888 at St Mary's Church, Liscard. He had one sister, Margaret Mary Ann (born October 1891, Liscard), and three brothers, John B. (born 1877, Northampton), Aeneas Francon Williams (born 1886, Liscard) and George Stanley (born 1890, Liverpool). Williams grew up in an artistic and literary household: his father John Francon Williams was a writer, geographer, cartographer, and inventor. His brother Aeneas Francon Williams was also a writer and a missionary. By 1901, the family had moved to the South of England and was living at Queens Grove Road in the affluent area of Chingford in Essex.

Williams trained at Edinburgh College of Art and the University of Edinburgh and Moray House Training College and was awarded a DA (Edin.). His first professional job was as a designer.

In 1916, during the First World War, Williams joined the King's Own Scottish Borderers 3rd Battalion, an infantry regiment of the Scottish Division of the British Army. He was stationed in Scotland.

== Career ==
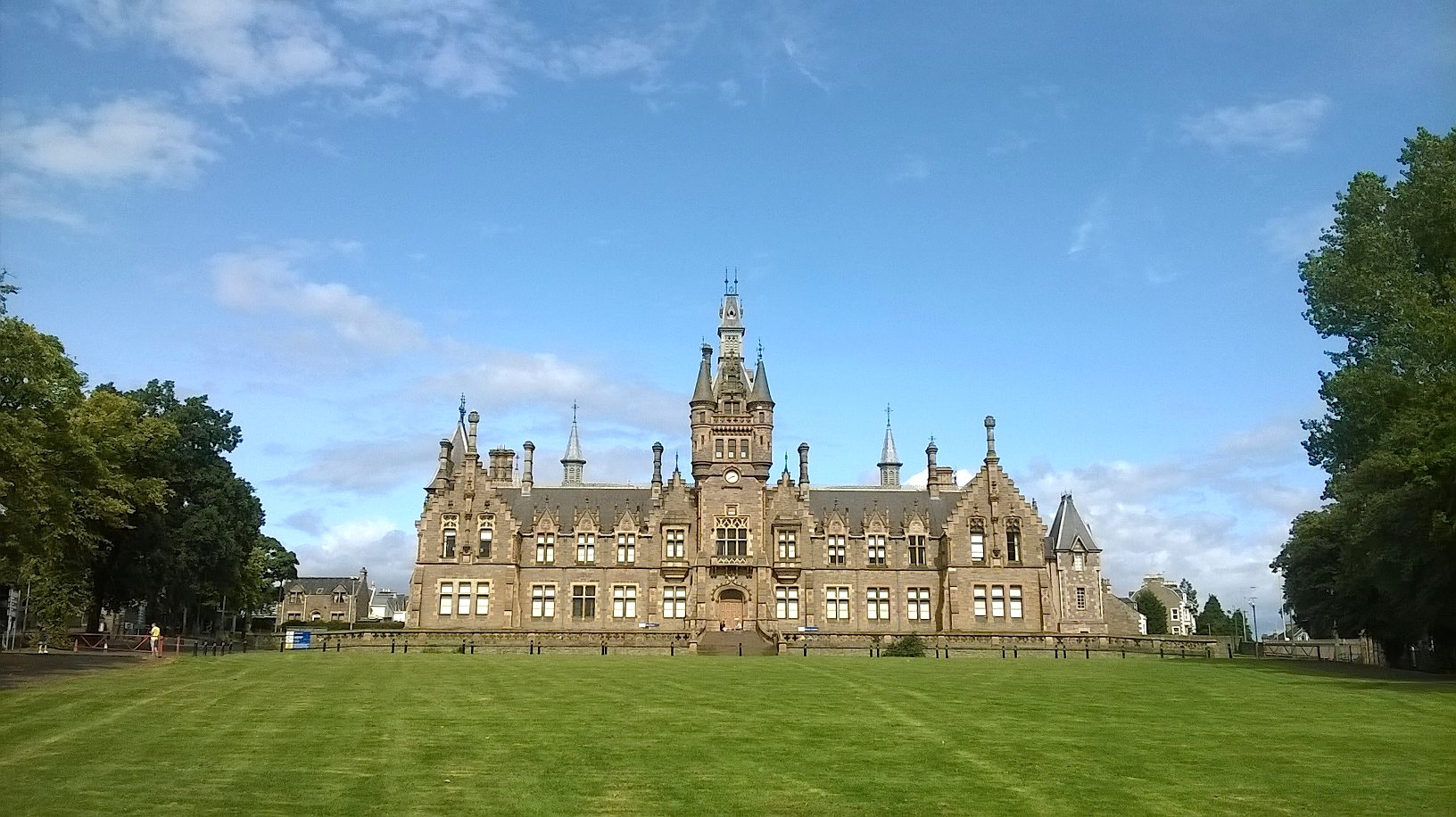
Moragn Academy Dundee

At the end of the war, Williams remained in Scotland and lived and worked for a short period in Oban in Argyll, where he was the principal art teacher at Oban High School. In October 1922, Williams moved to Dundee to take up the post of assistant art master at Morgan Academy, a position he held until 1929. In Dundee, Williams lived with his wife and two children (a daughter and a son, Arthur Alexander) at 35 Blackness Avenue. In 1929, Williams became the principal art master at Logie Central School in Dundee, where he remained teaching for 15 years until his death in 1944.

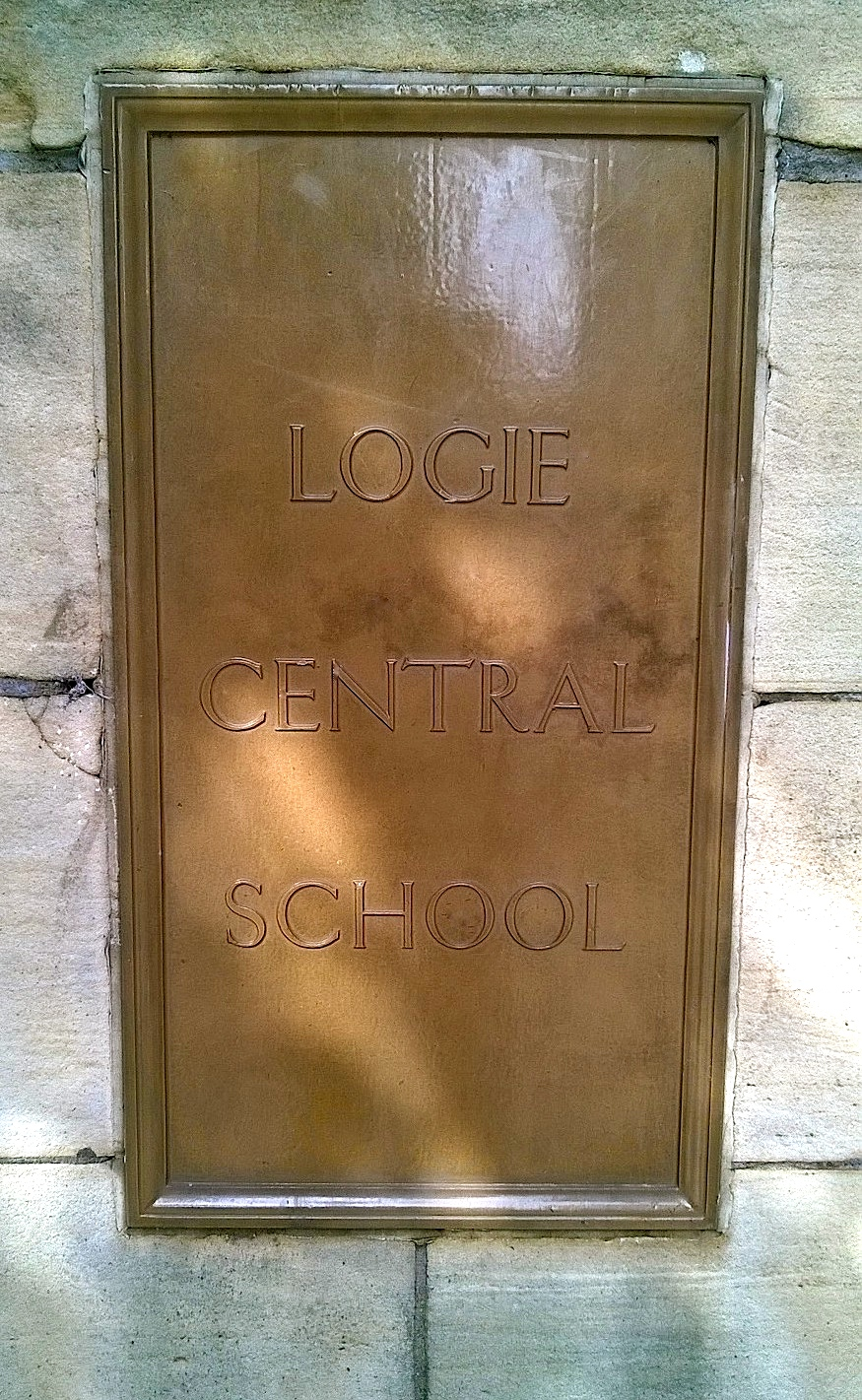
The Original Logie Central School Dundee Entrance Sign

=== Twentieth-century Scottish art ===
Williams was a respected figure amongst Dundee art circles and art world. He was a contemporary of such artists as John MacLaughlan Milne and James McIntosh Patrick. During the inter-war years, a classical tradition in Scottish painting had emerged that experimented with Surrealism. It was also influenced by the meticulous technique of Italian Renaissance painting. Williams was appointed a Fellow of the Royal Society of Arts, and was also a member of the Dundee Arts Society for many years. An artist of repute, Williams had numerous paintings exhibited, including "God Be With You 'Till We Meet Again" and the seascape "Outward Bound" that were exhibited in 1937 at the Royal Cambrian Academy in Cardiff. His seascape ‘Outward Bound’ was also exhibited at the Imperial Gallery in Kensington, London. Williams was an active member of the Dundee Art Society and the treasurer of Dundee’s Elim Foursquare Church. Williams exhibited numerous works in the 1938 Dundee Art Society's 32nd Fine Art Exhibition held at the Victoria Art Galleries, Dundee, from 4 March–15 April, and at the 1942 Dundee Art Society's 33rd Fine Art Exhibition at the Victoria Art Galleries, Dundee, from 12 September–11 October. David used two spellings of his middle name ‘Dougall’, dropping one of the L’s, preferring to use ‘Dougal’ on many occasions with regards to his art and paintings.

David Dougal Williams died on 27 September 1944 after a brief illness from appendicitis–gangrenous and cardiovascular degeneration. He is buried in Western Cemetery, Dundee. The 1944 Dundee Art Society Report printed an obituary:

"David Dougall Williams was a member of the Society for many years. He contributed to its exhibitions distinguished pictures of the great vessels that sail the seas. His last picture, in the 1944 Exhibition, was a fine example of his work. Mr. Williams was the popular and enthusiastic Art Master of Logie Central School, where his influence was strong and helpful to his many students."

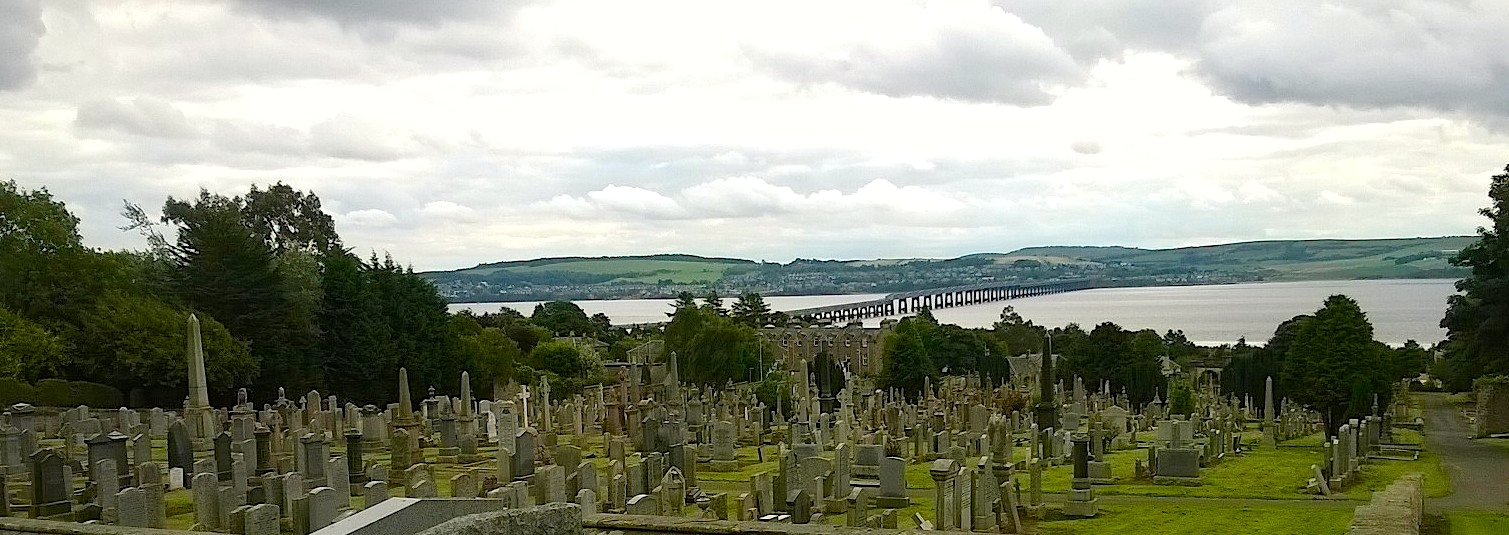
Western Cemetery, Dundee, 2017

== Family ==
Williams was married to Minnie Johnston. Their son, Arthur Alexander Francon Williams, was also an artist and trained at the University of Dundee Duncan of Jordanstone College of Art and Design. Minnie died in Dundee in 1978, aged 86. Their son Arthur Alexander died in Montrose in 2001, aged 83.

== Sources ==
- Royal Cambrian Academy of Art, 1937 Catalogue, 55th Annual Exhibition (retrieved 6 August 2017) - Williams, Mr. David Dougal, 35, Blackness Avenue, Dundee.- paintings exhibited: "God Be With You 'Till We Meet Again" (number 294) and "Outward Bound" (number 298) in the catalogue – page 30 & 40:
- Historical Records of The King's Own Scottish Borderers:
- David D. Williams paintings exhibited at the 1936 Dundee Art Society 31st Fine Art Exhibition at the Victoria Art Galleries (McManus Galleries), Dundee, from 20 March to 2 May: Catalogue numbers: 55: "Roses" (page 15), 63: "Rose Study" (page 16), 74: "The Incoming Tide" (page 17), 106: "On the Wings of the Wind" (page 21), 303: "Nearing Home" (page 48).
- David D. Williams paintings exhibited at the 1938 Dundee Art Society 32nd Fine Art Exhibition at the Victoria Art Galleries (McManus Galleries), Dundee, from 4 March to 15 April: Catalogue numbers: 12: "Roses" (page 9), 41: "Still Life" (page 12), 67: "Still Life" (page 14), 104: "Joyous Hours" (page 18), 108: "Till We Meet Again" (page 19): Water colors: 220: "Nearing Home" (page 31), 231: "A Daughter of the Sea" (page 32), 247: "Roses" (page 34), 309: "On The Wings of The Wind" (page 40), 320: "Brown Sands" (page 41)
- David D. Williams paintings exhibited at the 1942 Dundee Art Society 33rd Fine Art Exhibition at the Victoria Art Galleries (McManus Galleries), Dundee, from 12 September to 11 October: Catalogue numbers: 29: "Roses" (page 3), 66: "Incoming Tide" (page 4), 94: "In The Days Of Sail" (page 5), 166: "Life Line" (page 7).
- The Dictionary of Scottish Art and Architecture by Peter J. M. McEwan publ. Glengarden (2004) (ISBN 9780954755218) page 593 – David Williams, painter, exhibited (4) at the RCA 1936-37
- The Dictionary of British Artists 1880–1940, by Jane Johnson & A. Greutzner, publ. Baron Publishing (1976) (ISBN 9780902028364), page 548 – David Williams, painter, exh. 1936-1937, Dundee, RCA 4.
