= George Philip (cartographer) =

Cartographer

- Born: 1800; Huntly, Aberdeenshire
- Died: 3 October 1882; Bickley, Kent
- Occupation(s): Cartographer and map publisher
- Years active: 1834–1882

George Philip (1800–1882) was a Scottish cartographer, map publisher and founder of the publishing house George Philip & Son Ltd.

== Family ==
George Philip was born in Huntly, Aberdeenshire, to a staunchly Calvinist family. In 1819 George travelled to Liverpool where his brother Robert, who was a nonconformist minister, lived. Here George made his home and in 1819 George became assistant to the Liverpool bookseller, William Grapel. In 1834, Philip set up his own business as a bookseller and stationer in Paradise Street, Liverpool. He rapidly expanded the business by producing books, particularly educational works and maps. Within his first year of trading to keep up with demand he had to move his business into larger premises at the Atlas Buildings in South Castle Street. George and his wife Jane had a daughter Jane (born 1827) and one son, George (1823–1902). In 1848, George Jr. was admitted as a partner into the family publishing business now called George Philip & Son Ltd.

== George Philip & Son Ltd. ==
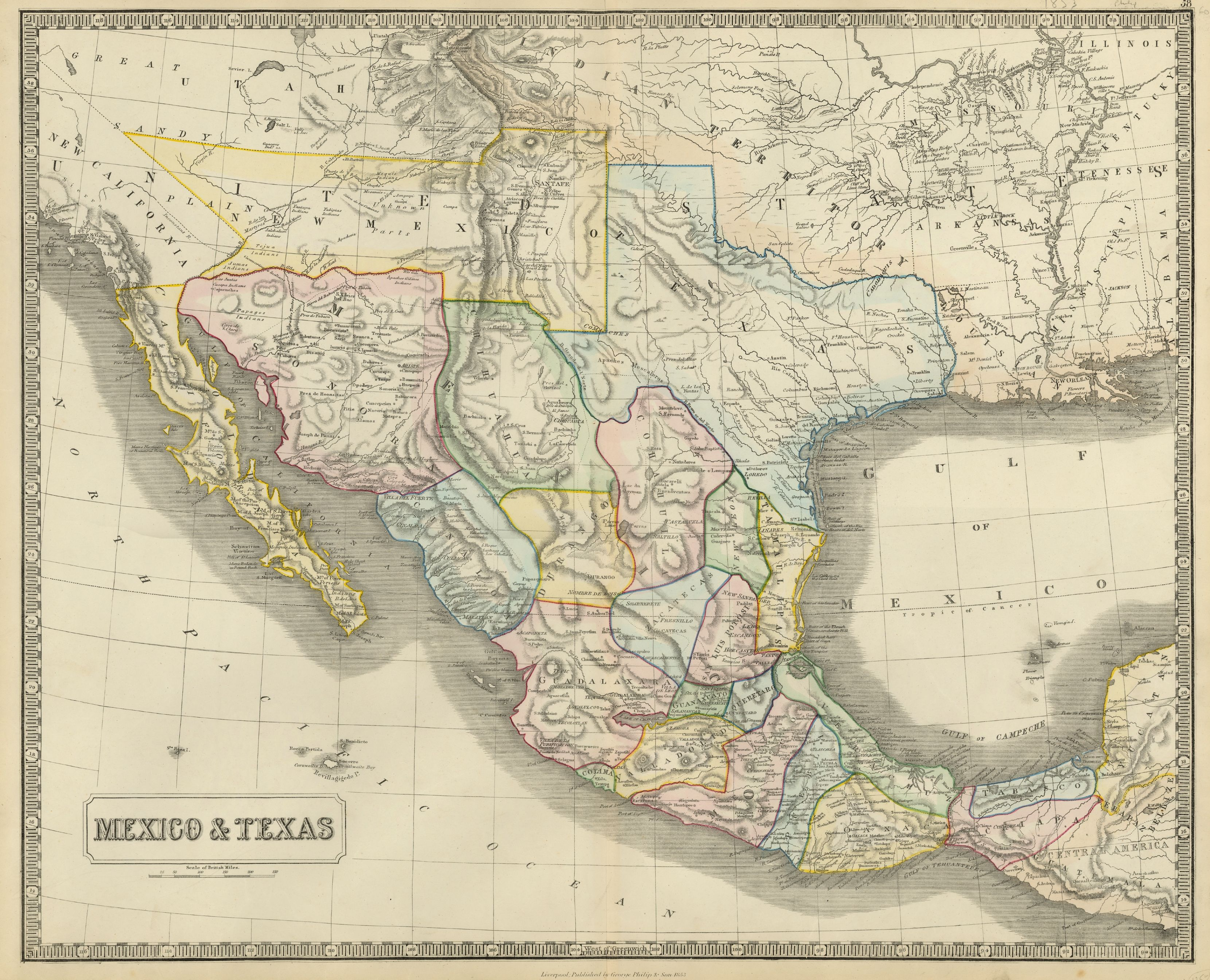
Philip & Son's map Mexico & Texas, 1853

During the early 1840s George Philip opened and ran a bookseller's and stationer's shop in South Castle Street, Liverpool, and it was during this period he laid the foundations for building and expanding his publishing empire from which he would eventually amass a substantial fortune. His son George Jr. (1823-1902), along with his nephew Thomas Dash Philip (1829-1913), and Philip's daughter Jane Jr. (who served behind the counter), assisted him in the shop at South Castle Street. Both George Jr. and Thomas would, in time, head the family-run business. In 1851 the England Census shows George Philip senior and his family resided in a grand town house at 21 Great George Square, Westside, situated in Liverpool's prestigious and affluent Georgian quarter.

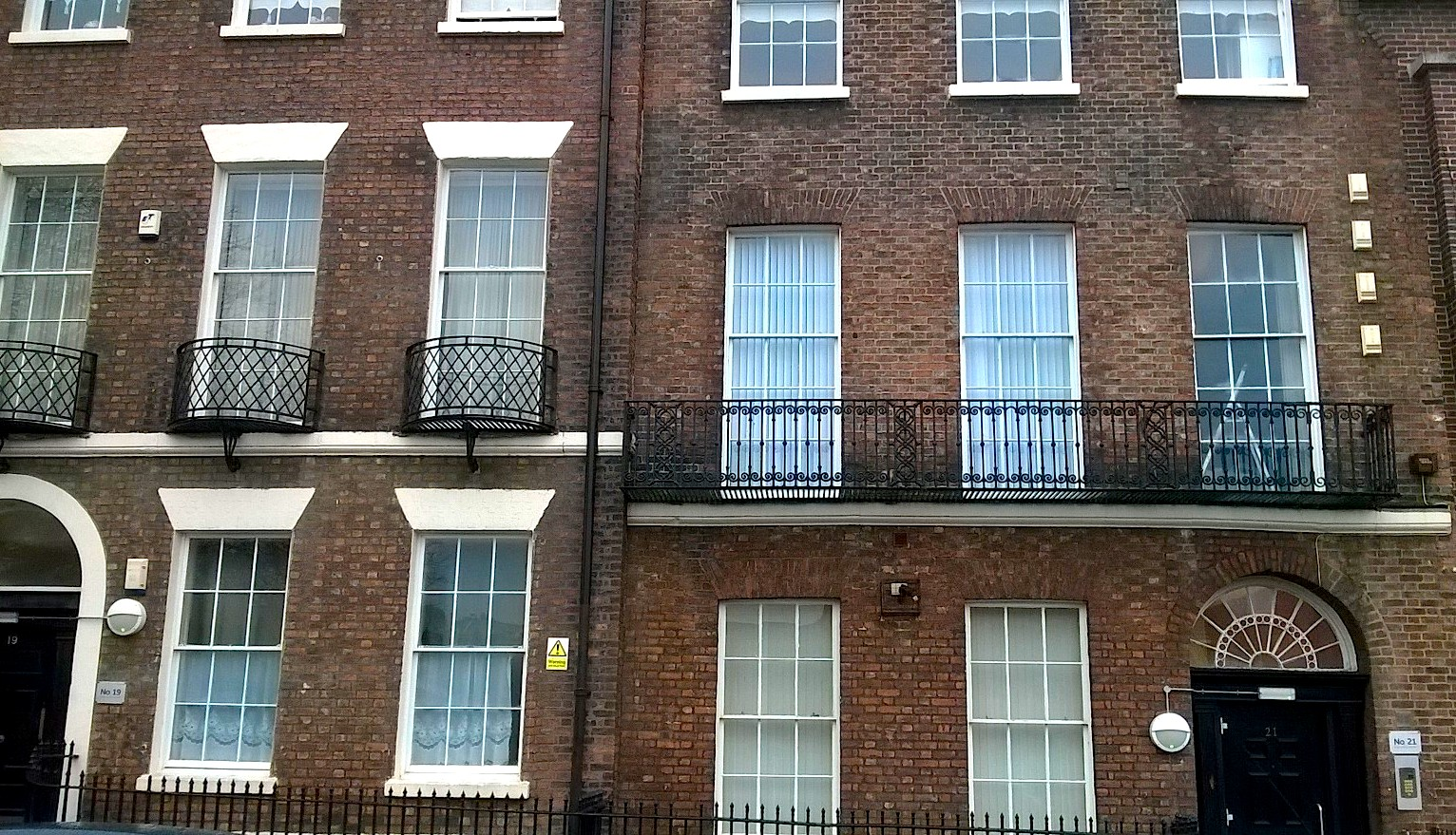
21 Great George Square (right), Liverpool (the former Georgian townhouse belonging to the publisher George Philip)

George's nephew Thomas Dash Philip was also living with the family. The Philip's also employed two live-in servants to assist George's wife Jane with the day-to-day running of the household. In 1856, George Philip & Son Ltd opened a house at 32 Fleet Street, London, where they sold their geographical and educational publications. They would later also occupy the premises next door at numbers 31 and 30 Fleet Street. In 1859, the company took over the extensive pile known as Caxton Buildings in South John Street, Liverpool, which became the company's headquarters in the city. With the establishment of their printing works in Caxton Buildings, new power-driven machinery gave the company the capacity to increase production.

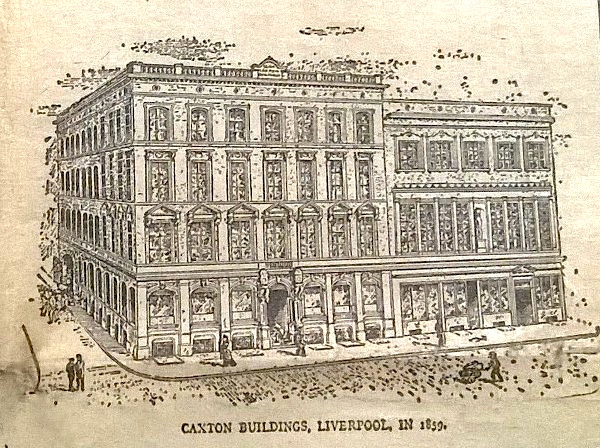
Caxton Buildings, Liverpool, 1859. The printing works of George Philip & Son Ltd were situated here.

Philip used cartographers such as John Bartholomew the elder, August Petermann, and William Hughes to produce maps on copper plates. Philip then had these printed and hand-coloured by his women tinters. By the time he produced his county maps of 1862 he was using machine coloured maps produced on power-driven lithographic presses. 'His maps ranged from the expensive Imperial Library Atlas (1864) to an atlas costing as little as 3d. and, although the bulk of his production was for the commercial, and particularly the educational market, he also produced important scientific maps, notably of North America, especially the Arctic and Pacific Northwest, and of the West Indies. The firm supplied atlases, geographical and history books, school textbooks, and an array of educational books and equipment. The company also produced textbooks for overseas countries, starting with an atlas for Australian schools in 1865 and for New Zealand in 1869. The demand from board schools, established after 1870, enabled further expansion in the market for general textbooks, school stationery, atlases and wall maps, etc Philip also employed many noted writers including the geographer and historian John Francon Williams who wrote, compiled and edited many books for the company from 1881 over a 20-year period.

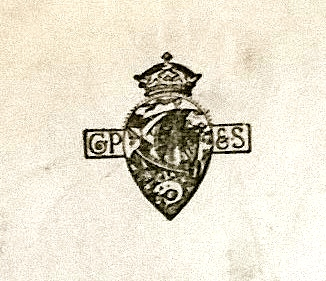
George Philip & Son logo used in many books published by the company

In 1867, a descriptive account of Philip Son & Nephew, based at Atlas and Victoria Buildings, 45-51 South Castle Street, Liverpool, was written up in the book Liverpool of Today, The Maritime Metropolis of the World, published by Historical Publishing Company. ‘This well-known emporium may be aptly designated the great Liverpool depot for all the aids to learning, mental instruction, and useful knowledge. It would be superfluous for us to say anything in praise of an establishment, which has been universally recognized as the leading house of its class in the provinces. In addition to the extensive premises in South Castle Street the firm have a wholesale warehouse, occupying the whole of Caxton Buildings in South John Street, which is carried on under the style of George Philip and Son, paper manufacturers, wholesale, export, and manufacturing stationers. This is a noble pile of buildings, five stories in height. An idea of the extent of the business done here may be gathered from the fact that over 300 hands are employed on the premises. The firm manufacture account books of every description and undertake to make them to order. Their general stock is very large and in great variety. Philip Son and Nephew have classified their business under nine distinct heads':

- 1: Popular and Standard Books department, including one of the largest collections of prize books in the kingdom.
- 2: Educational department, including school books, stationery, maps, diagrams, needlework materials, gymnastic apparatus, and school furniture.
- 3: Kindergarten department, comprising all the latest and most improved articles for varied occupations, etc., also a variety of games, puzzles, picture blocks etc.
- 4: Stationery department, comprising all kinds of commercial and family stationery.
- 5: Artists’ department, containing every requisite for drawing and painting, and a large selection of studies for school use.
- 6: Sunday-school department, including bibles, common prayer books, hymn books and church services.
- 7: Fancy Goods department, including albums, desks, work-boxes etc. suitable for school prizes or for presentation.
- 8: Photographic department, comprising upwards of 21,000 unmounted photographs.
- 9: Nautical and Engineering department, including Admiralty charts, engineering, scientific, and nautical books.

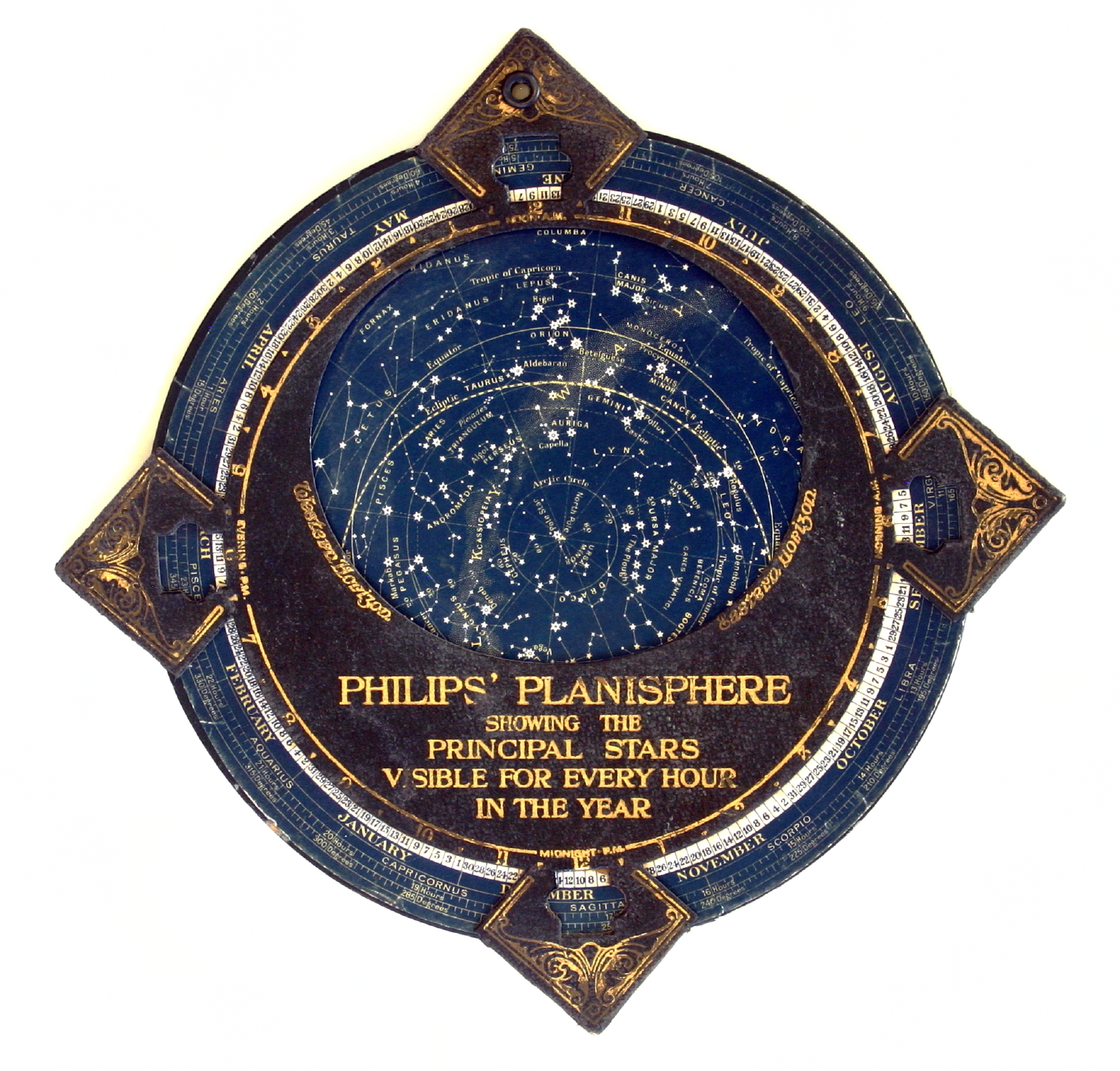
Philips Planisphere

'It would be impossible, within the limits we have at command, to do justice to a firm like Philip Son and Nephew, by mentioning even a tithe of the articles they keep in stock, much less giving a minute description of them. The premises occupied by the firm in South Castle Street (on the site of Old Pool Lane) are of very considerable size, having been enlarged from time to time during the last twenty years, by taking in adjoining properties, so that now they cover a wide area. They are of attractive appearance externally, and internally they are very handsome, being fitted up in superior style throughout, and arranged with every regard for the comfort and convenience of visitors. The firm have opened a showroom on the ground floor of the premises for the sale of school books and school stationery, and another portion of the building is devoted to school furniture of every description, maps, diagrams, and wall prints, and the other sections of the establishment are judiciously sub-divided, so that there is a separate department for each class of goods. A large and intelligent staff of assistants (about forty in number) are employed. The firm have issued a series of tourist and travelling maps, and maps and road books for cyclists, and they keep in stock guide books to all parts of the world. The business in South Castle Street was established in 1835, and its growth has kept pace with the increase and prosperity of Liverpool. The firm also have a very large and flourishing establishment at 32 Fleet Street, London, EC, which is carried on under the style of George Philip & Son.'

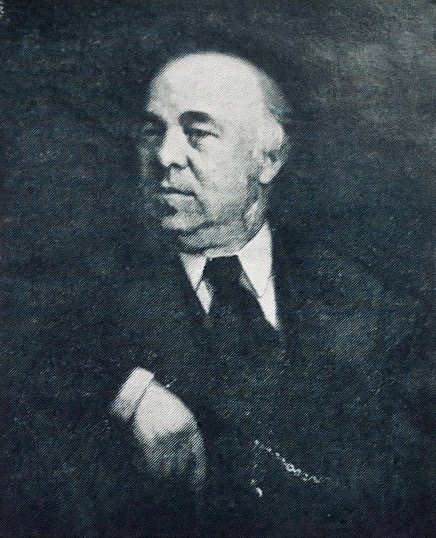
George Philip II (1823 - 1902)

In 1879 George Philip senior retired from the business to his country home The Retreat, in Bickley, Kent. Three years later on 3 October 1882, George Philip senior died at Huntly House, Lilley Road, Fairfield, Liverpool, at the home of one of his executors, the merchant James Askins Crowe. George Philip senior is buried alongside his wife Jane at Toxteth Park Cemetery (general section M, grave 40). George Philip’s estate upon his death was valued at £95,102 5s. 6d (the equivalent in 2018 to £11 million +). In October 1882 George Philip Jr. took over as head of the company. By this time the family firm had expanded to such a degree that George Philip Jr. now ran three companies; George Philip & Son Ltd, Philip and Company Ltd, based in South John Street, Liverpool, and Philip, Son and Nephew, based in South Castle Street, Liverpool. Over the following 20 years the companies continued to prosper greatly under the helm of George Philip Jr.

On 30 May 1902, George Philip the younger aged 78 died, leaving an estate valued at £112,314 16s 7d gross (2018 equivalent value would be over £13 million), including the personal net value of £78,914 16s 4d. ‘The funeral of Mr. George Philip (Jr.), who died several days ago at Southport, took place at Smithdown Road Cemetery (renamed Toxteth Park Cemetery) yesterday (3 June 1902). Long resident at Huntley House, Lilley Road, Fairfield, he was the head of the three widely known firms (in the city) of Philip and Co. Ltd (of South John Street), George Philip and Son (of Hope Street), and Philip, Son and Nephew (of South Castle Street). (Among) the chief mourners were Thomas Dash Philip, T. N. Philip, George Stanley Philip, George Philip and Joseph Collyer. Amongst the general body of mourners, who included a large number of employees, were Colonel Whitney V.D., Captain J. Macnab R.N.R., and Messrs., T. I. Lloyd, R. Tunnicliffe, J. Fitzgerald, writer John Francon Williams, C. F. Bell, W. A. Webb and John S. Arthur.

Thereafter Thomas Dash Philip took control of the three firms.

=== The RMS Titanic Connection ===
In Liverpool, apart from Admiralty House, Philip Son & Nephew Ltd were the only company to keep all the Admiralty charts and books. As such, the company had for many years conducted business with the large shipping lines based in the city including White Star Line and Cunard. In 1912, as with other White Star passenger liners, when RMS Titanic was being fitted out for its inaugural Atlantic crossing, her navigational charts and sailing directions were supplied by Philip, Son & Nephew Ltd, ‘booksellers, mercantile and export stationers, map, chart and educational publishers etc.’ of 45-51 South Castle Street, Liverpool. J. Bruce Ismay, chairman and managing director of the White Star Line and a passenger on and a survivor of the RMS Titanic sinking, also bought his personal stationery from Philip, Son & Nephew Ltd. A letter survives in the J. Bruce Ismay archive in the Maritime Archives and Library (National Museum Liverpool) from a Mr. Radcliffe acknowledging receipt of a receipt from Philip, Son & Nephew Ltd, for mercantile stationery for Ismay's mansion ‘Sandheys’ in Mossley Hill Road, Liverpool.

== George Philip & Son Ltd; twentieth century onward ==
A rare photograph of the interior of George Philip & Son Ltd taken in 1917 exists in the Getty Images Archive that shows various employees in the process of assembling globes. During this period the company was producing a large amount of globes in all sizes including the unusual and unique Betts's Portable Terrestrial Collapsible Globe. In 1927, George Philip and Son Ltd produced a unique map of Europe marked with the paths of totality for all total solar eclipses visible in this area during the 20th century. The map was modified by the drawing office of the Science Museum for an exhibition held in 1927. The display at the Science Museum in South Kensington was to celebrate the total solar eclipse that was going to pass over North Wales and North West England that year. The company opened several new branches including 1 Dee Lane, West Kirby, 34 and later 54 Brows Lane, Formby, and 79 Lord Street, Southport. In 1947, John Keith Stanford, owner of Stanfords bookshop and publishing house in Covent Garden, London, decided to sell the company to George Philip & Son Ltd. In 1949, British Pathé produced Globe Making, a short newsreel that shows the art of making a globe. The black and white film is shot in a globe-making factory described as being "in Willesden" (North West London), and thought to be the George Philip & Son Ltd factory in Victoria Road, North Acton (on the Park Royal industrial estate). In 1955, British Pathé revisited the same North West London factory to shoot Globe Making: How the World is Made, a colour newsreel also showing the art of globe making. The films give a fascinating insight into the art of making a globe by hand.

George Philip & Son Ltd operated independently for over 140 years until the company was sold in 1987 to Reed International where it continued to trade as George Philip Ltd. In 1998, following a management buy-out of the Illustrated books division, Philip's became part of the Octopus Publishing Group. Hachette Livre acquired the group in 2001.

== Further reference ==
- Philip, Son & Nephew files (2 boxes) (1879-1980s) relating to their store at South Castle Street, Liverpool (prior to WWII) and their new store in Liverpool built after WWII. The boxes contain pictures, photographs, biographical details of the Philip family genealogy, newspaper advertisement cuttings, newspaper articles, letters, shop renovation plans, board meeting minutes, various yearly accounts etc. Held at Liverpool Central Library, 3rd Floor, research department.
- The Royal Geographical Society holds an archive relating to George Philip & Son Ltd. The Philip Archive material held by the Society relates mainly to the publishing history of the firm (catalogues, price lists, variant editions, advertising, etc.) Apart from a partial listing made some years ago, the bulk of the material remains un-catalogued.
- An oil painting of George Philip exists that was housed at George Philip Ltd, 12–14 Long Acre, London, and is now owned by George Philip Properties Group.
