= William Hughes (geographer) =

English geographer and cartographer

William Hughes FRGS
- Born: William Hughes; 1818
- Died: 21 May 1876 (aged 57–58); St John's Wood, London, England
- Occupations: Geographer; Cartographer; Author; Professor

William Hughes FRGS (1818 – 21 May 1876) was an English geographer, cartographer, author and academic.

== Life ==
In early life Hughes was in business as an engraver in Pentonville, London. In 1840 he became a lecturer at St John's College, Battersea.

Hughes was professor of geography at King's College and Queen's College, London and Royal Female Naval School. He was for many years Examiner in Geography to the College of Preceptors. He died at his home, Adelaide Road, St John's Wood, London.

== Works ==
Hughes was the author of many books; atlases for the classroom, and books for biblical studies and general reference. He was also a prolific editor of reference works and textbooks. Some of his publications were later revised by Sir Richard Gregory, and by John Francon Williams.

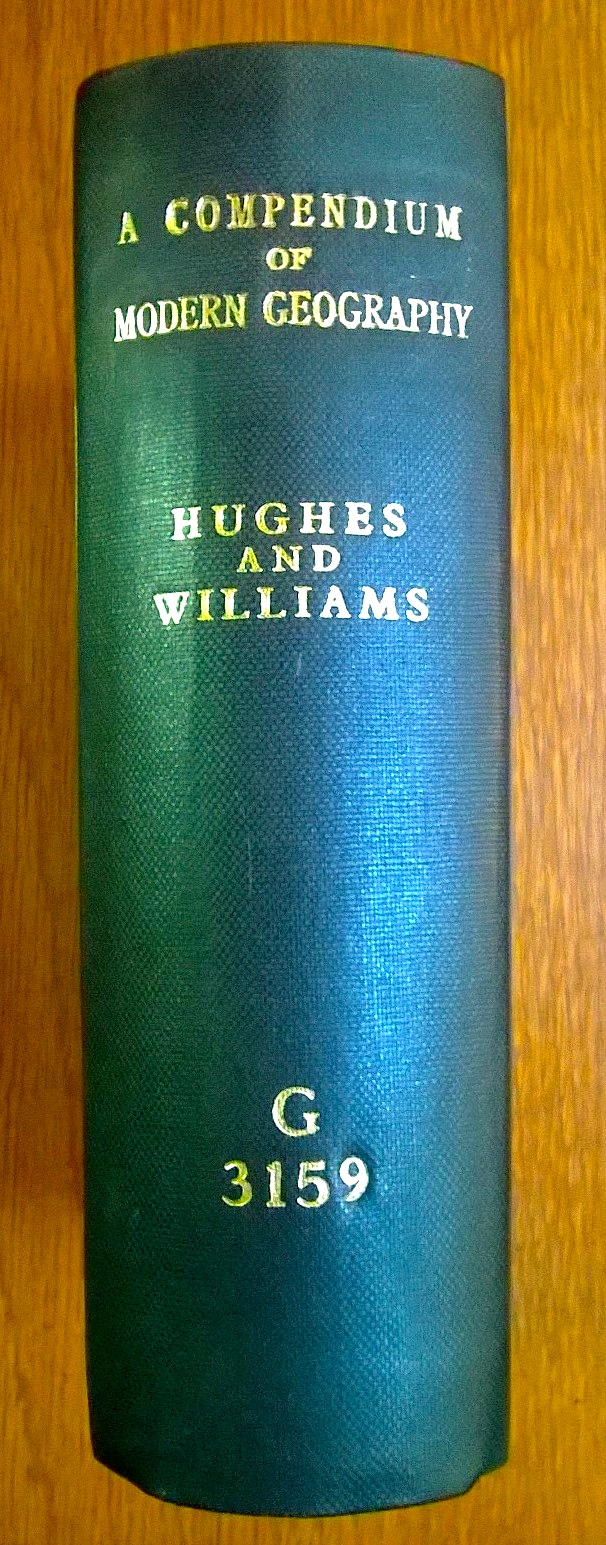
A Compendium of Modern Geography by William Hughes and John Francon Williams, 1893

== Partial bibliography ==
- Directions for Taking Instructions on Wills 1840
- Three Students of Grays Inn (novel) 1846
- The Stamp Duties Act 1850
- The Origin and Condition of the Australian Colonies Longman & Co. 1852
- Manual of Mathematical Geography 1852
- A Manual of Geography, Physical, Industrial and Political 1852
- It's All for the Best (3-volume novel) 1853
- A Class-book of Modern Geography 1859
- Philips' Family Atlas of Physical, General and Classical Geography 1859
- A Manual of Geography
- Manual of British Geography
- Elementary Class-book of Modern Geography 1860
- A Manual of European Geography 1861
- A Class-book of Physical Geography 1861
- Outlines of Geography 1864
- The Geography of River Systems 1865
- Elementary Class-book of Physical Geography 1866
- Geography in its Relation to History 1870
- Geography of the British Isles 1887
- Bible Maps pub. John W. Parker, London
- Philips' Atlas of Scripture Geography
- Hughes W. (Revised by R. A. Gregory) An Elementary Classbook of Physical Geography 1904
- General Geography, Simplified for beginners (in Gleig's School Series)
- Geography of the British Empire, Simplified for beginners (in Gleig's School Series)
- The Child's First Book of Geography (in Gleig's School Series)
