= Transverse Mercator: Redfearn series =

Transverse Mercator projection has many implementations. Louis Krüger in 1912 developed one of his two implementations that expressed as a power series in the longitude difference from the central meridian. These series were recalculated by Laurence Patrick Lee in 1946, by J.C.B. Redfearn in 1948, and by Paul D. Thomas in 1952. These series are often referred to as the Redfearn series, or the Thomas series. This implementation is of great importance since it is widely used in the U.S. State Plane Coordinate System, in national (Great Britain, Ireland and many others) and also international mapping systems, including the Universal Transverse Mercator coordinate system (UTM). They are also incorporated into the GEOTRANS coordinate converter made available by the United States National Geospatial-Intelligence Agency. When paired with a suitable geodetic datum, the series deliver high accuracy in zones less than a few degrees in east-west extent.

== Preliminaries I: datum and ellipsoid parameters ==
The series must be used with a geodetic datum which specifies the position, orientation and shape of a reference ellipsoid. Although the projection formulae depend only on the shape parameters of the reference ellipsoid the full set of datum parameters is necessary to link the projection coordinates to true positions in three-dimensional space. The datums and reference ellipsoids associated with particular implementations of the Redfearn formulae are listed below. A comprehensive list of important ellipsoids is given in the article on the Figure of the Earth.

In specifying ellipsoids it is normal to give the semi-major axis (equatorial axis), $a$, along with either the inverse flattening, $1/f$, or the semi-minor axis (polar axis), $b$, or sometimes both. The series presented below use the eccentricity, $e$, in preference to the flattening, $f$. In addition they use the parameters $n$, called the third flattening, and $e'$, the second eccentricity. There are only two independent shape parameters and there are many relations between them: in particular

$$\begin{align}
f&=\frac{a-b}{a}, \qquad  e^2=2f-f^2, \qquad e'^2=\frac{e^2}{1-e^2}\\
b&=a(1-f)=a(1-e^2)^{1/2},\qquad  n=\frac{a-b}{a+b}.
\end{align}$$

The projection formulae also involve $\rho(\phi)$, the radius of curvature of the meridian (at latitude $\phi$), and $\nu(\phi)$, the radius of curvature in the prime vertical. (The prime vertical is the vertical plane orthogonal to the meridian plane at a point on the ellipsoid). The radii of curvature are defined as follows:

$$\nu(\phi)=\frac{a}{\sqrt{1-e^2\sin^2\phi}},
\qquad
\rho(\phi)=\frac{\nu^3(1-e^2)}{a^2}.$$

In addition the functions $\beta(\phi)$ and $\eta(\phi)$ are defined as:

$$\beta(\phi)=\frac{\nu(\phi)}{\rho(\phi)},\qquad
\eta^2=\beta-1={e'^2\cos^2\!\phi}.$$

For compactness it is normal to introduce the following abbreviations:

$$s=\sin\phi,\qquad
c=\cos\phi,\qquad
t=\tan\phi.$$

== Preliminaries II: meridian distance ==
=== Meridian distance ===
The article on Meridian arc describes several methods of computing $m(\phi)$, the meridian distance from the equator to a point at latitude $\phi$ : the expressions given below are those used in the 'actual implementation of the Transverse Mercator projection by the OSGB. The truncation error is less than 0.1mm so the series is certainly accurate to within 1mm, the design tolerance of the OSGB implementation.

$$\begin{align}
m(\phi)&=B_0\phi+B_2\sin 2\phi+B_4\sin4\phi+B_6\sin6\phi+\cdots,
\end{align}$$

where the coefficients are given to order $n^3$ (order $e^6$) by

$$\begin{align}
B_0  &=  b\bigg(1+n+\frac{5}{4}n^2+\frac{5}{4}n^3 \bigg),
\qquad
B_4 =  b\bigg(\frac{15}{16}n^2+\frac{15}{16}n^3 \bigg),\\
B_2  &= -    b\bigg(\frac{3}{2}n+\frac{3}{2}n^2+\frac{21}{16}n^3 \bigg),
\qquad
B_6 = -    b\bigg(\frac{35}{48}n^3\bigg).
\end{align}$$

The meridian distance from equator to pole is

$$m_p=m(\pi/2)=\pi B_0/2\,.$$

The form of the series specified for UTM is a variant of the above exhibiting higher order terms with a truncation error of 0.03mm.

==== Inverse meridian distance ====
Neither the OSGB nor the UTM implementations define an inverse series for the meridian distance; instead they use an iterative scheme. For a given meridian distance $M$ first set $\phi_0=M/B_0$ and then iterate using

$$\begin{align}
\phi_n=\phi_{n-1}+ \frac{M-m(\phi_{n-1})}{B_0}, \qquad n=1,2,3,\ldots
\end{align}$$

until $|M-m(\phi_{n-1})|<0.01$mm.

The inversion can be effected by a series, presented here for later reference. For a given meridian distance, $M$, define the rectifying latitude by

$$\mu=\frac{\pi M}{2 m_p}.$$

The geodetic latitude corresponding to $M$ is (Snyder page 17):

$$\begin{align}
\phi&=\mu+D_2\sin 2\mu+D_4\sin4\mu+D_6\sin6\mu+D_8\sin8\mu+\cdots,\\
\end{align}$$

where, to $O(n^4)$,

$$\begin{align}
D_2 & = \frac{3}{2}n-\frac{27}{32}n^3, &
D_4 & = \frac{21}{16}n^2-\frac{55}{32}n^4,\\[8pt]
D_6 & = \frac{151}{96}n^3, &
D_8 & = \frac{1097}{512}n^4.
\end{align}$$

== An outline of the method ==
The normal aspect of the Mercator projection of a sphere of radius $R$ is described by the equations

$$x  = R\lambda, \qquad\qquad y  = R\psi,$$

where $\psi$, the isometric latitude, is given by

$$\begin{align}
\psi &= \ln \left[\tan \left(\frac{\pi}{4} + \frac{\phi}{2} \right) \right].
\end{align}$$

On the ellipsoid the isometric latitude becomes

$$\begin{align}
\psi &= \ln \left[\tan \left(\frac{\pi}{4} + \frac{\phi}{2} \right) \right]
-\frac{e}{2} \ln \left[ \frac {1 + e\sin\phi}{1 - e\sin\phi} \right].
\end{align}$$

By construction, the projection from the geodetic coordinates ($\phi$,$\lambda$) to the coordinates ($\psi$,$\lambda$) is conformal. If the coordinates ($\psi$,$\lambda$) are used to define a point $\zeta=\psi+i\lambda$ in the complex plane, then any analytic function $f(\zeta)$ will define another conformal projection. Kruger's method involves seeking the specific $f(\zeta)$ which generates a uniform scale along the central meridian, $\lambda=0$. He achieved this by investigating a Taylor series approximation with the projection coordinates given by:

$$\begin{align}
y+ix&=f(\zeta)=f(\psi+i\lambda)\\
&= f(\psi+i.0) + A_1\lambda+ A_2\lambda^2+ A_3\lambda^3+ \ldots,
\end{align}$$

where the real part of $f(\psi+i.0)$ must be proportional to the meridian distance function $m(\phi)$. The (complex) coefficients $A_n$ depend on derivatives of $f(\zeta)$ which can be reduced to derivatives of $m(\phi)$ with respect to $\psi$, (not $\phi$). The derivatives are straightforward to evaluate in principle but the expressions become very involved at high orders because of the complicated relation between $\psi$ and $\phi$. Separation of real and imaginary parts gives the series for $x$ and $y$ and further derivatives give the scale and convergence factors.

== The series in detail ==
This section presents the eighth order series as published by Redfearn (but with $x$ and $y$ interchanged and the longitude difference from the central meridian denoted by $\lambda$ instead of $\omega$). Equivalent eighth order series, with different notations, can be found in Snyder (pages 60–64) and at many web sites such as that for the Ordnance Survey of Great Britain.

The direct series are developed in terms of the longitude difference from the central meridian, expressed in radians: the inverse series are developed in terms of the ratio $x/a$. The projection is normally restricted to narrow zones (in longitude) so that both of the expansion parameters are typically less than about 0.1, guaranteeing rapid convergence. For example in each UTM zone these expansion parameters are less than 0.053 and for the British national grid (NGGB) they are less than 0.09. All of the direct series giving $x$, $y$, scale $k$, convergence $\gamma$ are functions of both latitude and longitude and the parameters of the ellipsoid: all inverse series giving $\phi$, $\lambda$, $k$, $\gamma$ are functions of both $x$ and $y$ and the parameters of the ellipsoid.

=== Direct series ===
In the following series $\lambda$ is the difference of the longitude of an arbitrary point and the longitude of the chosen central meridian: $\lambda$ is in radians and is positive east of the central meridian. The W coefficients are functions of $\phi$ listed below. The series for $y$ reduces to the scaled meridian distance when $\lambda=0$.

$$\begin{align}
x(\lambda,\phi)&=k_0\nu\left[\lambda c
+\frac{\lambda^3c^3 W_3}{3!}
+\frac{\lambda^5c^5 W_5}{5!}
+\frac{\lambda^7c^7 W_7}{7!}\right] , \\[1ex]
y(\lambda,\phi)&=k_0\left[m(\phi) +\frac{\lambda^2 \nu c^2t}{2}
+\frac{\lambda^4 \nu c^4tW_4}{4!}
+\frac{\lambda^6 \nu c^6tW_6}{6!}
+\frac{\lambda^8 \nu c^8tW_8}{8!} \right],
\end{align}$$

=== Inverse series ===
The inverse series involve a further construct: the footpoint latitude. Given a point $(x,y)$ on the projection the footpoint is defined as the point on the central meridian with coordinates $(0,y)$. Since the scale on the central meridian is $k_0$ the meridian distance from the equator to the footpoint is equal to $m=y/k_0$. The corresponding footpoint latitude, $\phi_1$, is calculated by iteration or the inverse meridian distance series as described above.

$$\begin{align}
\mu&=\frac{\pi y}{2 m_p k_0},\\
\phi_1&=\mu+D_2\sin 2\mu+D_4\sin4\mu+D_6\sin6\mu+D_8\sin8\mu+\cdots,\\
\end{align}$$

Denoting functions evaluated at $\phi_1$ by a subscript '1', the inverse series are:

$$\begin{align}
\lambda(x,y)
&=
\frac{x}{c_1(k_0\nu_1)}
-\frac{x^{3}V_3}{3!c_1(k_0\nu_1)^3}
-\frac{x^{5}V_5}{5!c_1(k_0\nu_1)^5}
-\frac{x^{7}V_7}{7!c_1(k_0\nu_1)^7},
\\
\phi(x,y)&=\phi_1
-\frac{x^2  \beta_1t_1 }{2(k_0\nu_1)^2}
-\frac{x^4 \beta_1t_1 U_4}{4!(k_0\nu_1)^4}
-\frac{x^6  \beta_1t_1 U_6}{6!(k_0\nu_1)^6}
-\frac{x^8 \beta_1t_1 U_8}{8!(k_0\nu_1)^8}.
\end{align}$$

=== Point scale and convergence ===
The point scale $k$ is independent of direction for a conformal transformation. It may be calculated in terms of geographic or projection coordinates. Note that the series for $k$ reduce to $k_0$ when either $\lambda=0$ or $x=0$ . The convergence $\gamma$ may also be calculated (in radians) in terms of geographic or projection coordinates:

$$\begin{align}
k(\lambda,\phi)
&=k_0\left[1
+\frac{\lambda^2c^2H_2}{2}
+\frac{\lambda^4c^4H_4}{24}
+\frac{\lambda^6c^6H_6}{720}\right],\\
\gamma(\lambda,\phi)
&=\lambda s
+\frac{\lambda^3c^3t H_3}{3}
+\frac{\lambda^5c^5t H_5}{15}
+\frac{\lambda^7c^7tH_7}{315},\\
k(x,y)&=k_0\left[1
+\frac{x^2K_2}{2(k_0\nu_1)^2}
+\frac{x^4K_4}{24(k_0\nu_1)^4}
+\frac{x^6K_6}{720(k_0\nu_1)^6}\right]\\
\gamma(x,y) &=
\frac{xt_1}{k_0\nu_1}
+ \frac{x^3t_1 K_3}{3(k_0\nu_1)^3}
+ \frac{x^5t_1 K_5}{15(k_0\nu_1)^5}
+ \frac{x^7t_1 K_7}{315(k_0\nu_1)^7}.
\end{align}$$

=== The coefficients for all series ===
$$\begin{align}
W_3 &= \beta-t^2 \\
W_5 &= 4\beta^3(1-6t^2)+\beta^2(1+8t^2) -2\beta t^2 +t^4 \\
W_7 &= 61-479t^2+179t^4-t^6+O(e^2) \\
W_4 &= 4\beta^2+\beta-t^2 \\
W_6 &= 8\beta^4(11{-}24t^2)-28\beta^3(1{-}6t^2) +\beta^2(1{-}32t^2)
-2\beta t^2 +t^4 \\
W_8 &= 1385-3111t^2+543t^4-t^6 +O(e^2)\\
V_3&= \beta_1+2t_1^2 \\
V_5&= 4\beta_1^3(1-6t_1^2)-\beta_1^2(9-68t_1^2)
-72\beta_1 t_1^2 -24t_1^4\\
V_7&= 61+662t_1^2+1320t_1^4+720t_1^6  \\
U_4&= 4\beta_1^2-9\beta_1(1-t_1^2)-12t_1^2\\
U_6&= 8\beta_1^4(11-24t_1^2)-12\beta_1^3(21-71t_1^2)
+15\beta_1^2(15-98t_1^2+15t_1^4)  \\
&\qquad\qquad +180\beta_1(5t_1^2-3t_1^4)+360t_1^4\\
U_8&=-1385-3633t_1^2-4095t_1^4-1575t_1^6\\
H_2&=   \beta\\
H_4&=   4\beta^3(1-6t^2)+\beta^2(1+24t^2)-4\beta t^2\\
H_6&=61-148t^2+16t^4\\
H_3&=2\beta^2-\beta\\
H_5&=\beta^4(11-24t^2)-\beta^3(11-36t^2)
+\beta^2(2-14t^2)+\beta t^2\\
H_7&=17-26t^2+2t^4\\
K_2&=\beta_1   \\
K_4&=4\beta_1^3(1-6t_1^2)-3\beta_1^2(1-16t_1^2)
-24\beta_1 t_1^2\\
K_6&=1\\
K_3&=2\beta_1^2-3\beta_1 -t_1^2\\
K_5&=\beta_1^4(11-24t_1^2)-3\beta_1^3(8-23t_1^2)
+5\beta_1^2(3-14t_1^2)+30\beta_1 t_1^2+3t_1^4\\
K_7&=-17-77t_1^2-105t_1^4-45t_1^6
\end{align}$$

=== Accuracy of the series ===
The exact solution of Lee-Thompson, implemented by Karney (2011), is of great value in assessing the accuracy of the truncated Redfearn series. It confirms that the truncation error of the (eighth order) Redfearn series is less than 1 mm out to a longitude difference of 3 degrees, corresponding to a distance of 334 km from the central meridian at the equator but a mere 35 km at the northern limit of an UTM zone.

The Redfearn series become much worse as the zone widens. Karney discusses Greenland as an instructive example. The long thin landmass is centred on 42W and, at its broadest point, is no more than 750 km from that meridian whilst the span in longitude reaches almost 50 degrees. The Redfearn series attain a maximum error of 1 kilometre.

== Implementations ==
The implementations give below are examples of the use of the Redfearn series. The defining documents in various countries differ slightly in notation and, more importantly, in the neglect of some of the small terms. The analysis of small terms depends on the latitude and longitude ranges in the various grids. There are also slight differences in the formulae utilised for meridian distance: one extra term is sometimes added to the formula specified above but such a term is less than 0.1mm.

=== OSGB ===
The implementation of the transverse Mercator projection in Great Britain is fully described in the OSGB document A guide to coordinate systems in Great Britain, Appendices A.1, A.2 and C.

datum: OSGB36
ellipsoid: Airy 1830
major axis: 6 377 563.396
minor axis: 6 356 256.909
central meridian longitude: 2°W
central meridian scale factor : 0.9996012717
projection origin: 2°W and 0°N
true grid origin: 2°W and 49°N
false easting of true grid origin, E0 (metres): 400,000
false northing of true grid origin, N0 (metres): -100,000
E = E0 + x = 400000 + x
N = N0 + y -k0*m(49°)= y - 5527063

The extent of the grid is 300 km to the east and 400 km to the west of the central meridian and 1300 km north from the false origin, (OSGB Section 7.1), but with the exclusion of parts of Northern Ireland, Eire and France. A grid reference is denoted by the pair (E,N) where E ranges from slightly over zero to 800000m and N ranges from zero to 1300000m. To reduce the number of figures needed to give a grid reference, the grid is divided into 100 km squares, which each have a two-letter code. National Grid positions can be given with this code followed by an easting and a northing both in the range 0 and 99999m.

The projection formulae differ slightly from the Redfearn formulae presented here. They have been simplified by neglect of most terms of seventh and eighth order in $\lambda$ or $x/a$: the only exception is seventh order term in the series for $\lambda$ in terms of $x/a$. This simplification is based on the examination of the Redfearn terms over the actual extent of the grid. The only other differences are (a) the absorption of the central scale factor into the radii of curvature and meridian distance, (b) the replacement of the parameter $\beta$ by the parameter $\eta$ (defined above).

The OSGB manual includes a discussion of the Helmert transformations which are required to link geodetic coordinates on Airy 1830 ellipsoid and on WGS84.

=== UTM ===
The article on the Universal Transverse Mercator projection gives a general survey, but the full specification is defined in U.S. Defense Mapping Agency Technical Manuals TM8358.1 and TM8358.2. This section provides details for zone 30 as another example of the Redfearn formulae (usually termed Thomas formulae in the United States.)

ellipsoid: International 1924 (a.k.a. Hayford 1909)
major axis: 6 378 388.000
minor axis: 6 356 911.946
central meridian longitude: 3°W
projection origin: 3°W and 0°N
central meridian scale factor: 0.9996
true grid origin: 3°W and 0°N
false easting of true grid origin, E0: 500,000
E = E0 + x = 500000 + x
northern hemisphere false northing of true grid origin N0: 0
northern hemisphere: N = N0 + y = y
southern hemisphere false northing of true grid origin N0: 10,000,000
southern hemisphere: N = N0 + y = 10,000,000 + y

The series adopted for the meridian distance incorporates terms of fifth order in $n$ but the manual states that these are less than 0.03 mm (TM8358.2 Chapter 2). The projection formulae use, $e'$, the second eccentrity (defined above) instead of $n$. The grid reference schemes are defined in the article Universal Transverse Mercator coordinate system. The accuracy claimed for the UTM projections is 10 cm in grid coordinates and 0.001 arc seconds for geodetic coordinates.

=== Ireland ===
The transverse Mercator projection in Eire and Northern Ireland (an international implementation spanning one country and part of another) is currently implemented in two ways:

Irish grid reference system

datum: Ireland 1965
ellipsoid: Airy 1830 modified
major axis: 6 377 340.189
minor axis: 6 356 034.447
central meridian scale factor: 1.000035
true origin: 8°W and 53.5°N
false easting of true grid origin, E0: 200,000
false northing of true grid origin, N0: 250,000

The Irish grid uses the OSGB projection formulae.

Irish Transverse Mercator

datum: Ireland 1965
ellipsoid: GRS80
major axis: 6 378 137
minor axis: 6 356 752.314140
central meridian scale factor: 0.999820
true origin: 8°W and 53.5°N
false easting of true grid origin, E0: 600,000
false northing of true grid origin, N0: 750,000

This is an interesting example of the transition between use of a traditional ellipsoid and a modern global ellipsoid. The adoption of radically different false origins helps to prevent confusion between the two systems.

== See also ==
- Map projection
- Mercator projection
- Scale (map)
- Universal Transverse Mercator coordinate system
