= Helmert transformation =

Transformation method within a three-dimensional space

The transformation from a reference frame 1 to a reference frame 2 can be described with three translations Δx, Δy, Δz, three rotations Rx, Ry, Rz and a scale parameter μ.

The Helmert transformation (named after Friedrich Robert Helmert, 1843–1917) is a method of parametrization of geometric similarities, which is used in geodesy to compute transformations between datums. The Helmert transformation is also called seven-parameter transformation.

== Definition ==
The Helmert transformation can be expressed as:

$$X_T = C + \mu R X \,$$

where

- X is the initial point represented by a coordinate vector
- X_{T} is the point-transformed vector

The parameters are:

- C – translation vector, whose components are translations along the coordinate axes
- μ – scale factor, which must be divided by 1,000,000 and added to 1 when expressed in parts per million
- R – rotation matrix, which is decomposed into three rotations r_{x}, r_{y}, r_{z} around the three coordinate axes, whose angles are small in the geodesic context.

=== Variations ===
A special case is the two-dimensional Helmert transformation. Here, only four parameters are needed (two translations, one scaling, one rotation). These can be determined from two known points; if more points are available then checks can be made.

Sometimes it is sufficient to use the five parameter transformation, composed of three translations, only one rotation about the Z-axis, and one change of scale.

=== Restrictions ===
The Helmert transformation only uses one scale factor, so it is not suitable for:

- The manipulation of measured drawings and photographs
- The comparison of paper deformations while scanning old plans and maps.

In these cases, a more general affine transformation is preferable.

== Application ==
The Helmert transformation is used, among other things, in geodesy to transform the coordinates of the point from one coordinate system into another. Using it, it becomes possible to convert regional surveying points into the WGS84 locations used by GPS.

For example, starting with the Gauss–Krüger coordinate, x and y, plus the height, h, are converted into 3D values in steps:

1. Undo the map projection: calculation of the ellipsoidal latitude, longitude and height (W, L, H)
2. Convert from geodetic coordinates to geocentric coordinates: Calculation of x, y and z relative to the reference ellipsoid of surveying
3. 7-parameter transformation (where x, y and z almost always change by a few hundred metres at most, and distances by a few mm per km).
4. Because of this, terrestrially measured positions can be compared with GPS data; these can then be brought into the surveying as new points – transformed in the opposite order.

The third step consists of the application of a rotation matrix, multiplication with the scale factor $\mu = 1 + s$ (with a value near 1) and the addition of the three translations, c_{x}, c_{y}, c_{z}.

The coordinates of a reference system B are derived from reference system A by the following formula (position vector transformation convention and very small rotation angles simplification):

$$\begin{bmatrix}
X \\
Y \\
Z
\end{bmatrix}^B = \begin{bmatrix}
c_x \\
c_y \\
c_z
\end{bmatrix} + (1 + s\times10^{-6}) \cdot
\begin{bmatrix}
1   & -r_z &  r_y \\
r_z &  1   & -r_x \\
-r_y &  r_x & 1
\end{bmatrix} \cdot \begin{bmatrix}
X \\
Y \\
Z
\end{bmatrix}^A$$

or for each single parameter of the coordinate:

$$\begin{align}
X_B & = c_x + (1 + s \times 10^{-6}) \cdot (X_A - r_z \cdot Y_A +       r_y \cdot Z_A) \\
Y_B & = c_y + (1 + s \times 10^{-6}) \cdot (      r_z \cdot X_A + Y_A - r_x \cdot Z_A) \\
Z_B & = c_z + (1 + s \times 10^{-6}) \cdot (     -r_y \cdot X_A +       r_x \cdot Y_A + Z_A).
\end{align}$$

For the reverse transformation, each element is multiplied by −1.

The seven parameters are determined for each region with three or more "identical points" of both systems. To bring them into agreement, the small inconsistencies (usually only a few cm) are adjusted using the method of least squares – that is, eliminated in a statistically plausible manner.

=== Standard parameters ===
Note: the rotation angles given in the table are in arcseconds and must be converted to radians before use in the calculation.

EPSG Code	Region	Source datum	Target datum	Accuracy (metre)	c_{x} (metre)	c_{y} (metre)	c_{z} (metre)	s (ppm)	r_{x} (arcsecond)	r_{y} (arcsecond)	r_{z} (arcsecond)
8048	Australia	GDA94 (EPSG:4283)	GDA2020 (EPSG:7844)	0.01	0.06155	-0.01087	-0.04019	-0.009994	-0.0394924	-0.0327221	-0.0328979
9690	Australia	WGS84 (EPSG:4326)	GDA2020 (EPSG:7844)	3	0.06155	-0.01087	-0.04019	-0.009994	-0.0394924	-0.0327221	-0.0328979
1618	Austria	MGI (EPSG:4312)	WGS84 (EPSG:4326)	1.5	577.326	90.129	463.919	2.4232	5.137	1.474	5.297
1776	Germany (West)	DHDN (EPSG:4314)	ETRS89 (EPSG:4258)	3	598.1	73.7	418.2	6.7	0.202	0.045	-2.455
1777	Germany (West)	DHDN (EPSG:4314)	WGS84 (EPSG:4326)	3	598.1	73.7	418.2	6.7	0.202	0.045	-2.455
15869	Germany (East)	DHDN (EPSG:4314)	WGS84 (EPSG:4326)	2	612.4	77	440.2	2.55	-0.054	0.057	-2.797
1641	Ireland	TM65 (EPSG:4299)	WGS84 (EPSG:4326)	1	482.5	-130.6	564.6	8.15	-1.042	-0.214	-0.631
1953	Ireland	TM75 (EPSG:4300)	ETRS89 (EPSG:4258)	1	482.5	-130.6	564.6	8.15	-1.042	-0.214	-0.631
1954	Ireland	TM75 (EPSG:4300)	WGS84 (EPSG:4326)	1	482.5	-130.6	564.6	8.15	-1.042	-0.214	-0.631
8689	Slovenia	MGI 1901 (EPSG:3906)	Slovenia 1996 (EPSG:4765)	1	476.08	125.947	417.81	9.896638	-4.610862	-2.388137	11.942335
1314	United Kingdom	OSGB36 (EPSG:4247)	WGS84 (EPSG:4326)	2	446.448	-125.157	542.06	-20.489	0.15	0.247	0.842
1315	United Kingdom	OSGB36 (EPSG:4247)	ED50 (EPSG:4230)	2	535.948	-31.357	665.16	-21.689	0.15	0.247	0.998
1901	United States	NAD83(HARN) (EPSG:4152)	WGS84 (EPSG:4326)	1	-0.991	1.9072	0.5129	0	1.25033×10^{−7}	4.6785×10^{−8}	5.6529×10^{−8}

These are standard parameter sets for the 7-parameter transformation (or data transformation) between two datums. For a transformation in the opposite direction, inverse transformation parameters should be calculated or inverse transformation should be applied (as described in paper "On geodetic transformations"). The translations c_{x}, c_{y}, c_{z} are sometimes described as t_{x}, t_{y}, t_{z}, or dx, dy, dz. The rotations r_{x}, r_{y}, and r_{z} are sometimes also described as $\omega$, $\phi$ and $\kappa$. In the United Kingdom the prime interest is the transformation between the OSGB36 datum used by the Ordnance survey for Grid References on its Landranger and Explorer maps to the WGS84 implementation used by GPS technology. The Gauss–Krüger coordinate system used in Germany normally refers to the Bessel ellipsoid. A further datum of interest was ED50 (European Datum 1950) based on the Hayford ellipsoid. ED50 was part of the fundamentals of the NATO coordinates up to the 1980s, and many national coordinate systems of Gauss–Krüger are defined by ED50.

The earth does not have a perfect ellipsoidal shape, but is described as a geoid. Instead, the geoid of the earth is described by many ellipsoids. Depending upon the actual location, the "locally best aligned ellipsoid" has been used for surveying and mapping purposes. The standard parameter set gives an accuracy of about 7 m for an OSGB36/WGS84 transformation. This is not precise enough for surveying, and the Ordnance Survey supplements these results by using a lookup table of further translations in order to reach 1 cm accuracy.

== Estimating the parameters ==
If the transformation parameters are unknown, they can be calculated with reference points (that is, points whose coordinates are known before and after the transformation. Since a total of seven parameters (three translations, one scale, three rotations) have to be determined, at least two points and one coordinate of a third point (for example, the Z-coordinate) must be known. This gives a system with seven equations and seven unknowns, which can be solved.

For transformations between conformal map projections near an arbitrary point, the Helmert transformation parameters can be calculated exactly from the Jacobian matrix of the transformation function.

In practice, it is best to use more points. Through this correspondence, more accuracy is obtained, and a statistical assessment of the results becomes possible. In this case, the calculation is adjusted with the Gaussian least squares method.

A numerical value for the accuracy of the transformation parameters is obtained by calculating the values at the reference points, and weighting the results relative to the centroid of the points.

While the method is mathematically rigorous, it is entirely dependent on the accuracy of the parameters that are used. In practice, these parameters are computed from the inclusion of at least three known points in the networks. However the accuracy of these will affect the following transformation parameters, as these points will contain observation errors. Therefore, a "real-world" transformation will only be a best estimate and should contain a statistical measure of its quality.

== See also ==
- Geographic coordinate conversion
- Procrustes analysis
- Surveying
