= Israeli Transverse Mercator =

Coordinate system for Israel

Israeli Transverse Mercator - ITM

Israeli Transverse Mercator (ITM), also known as the New Israel Grid (NIG; Hebrew: רשת ישראל חדשה, רשת ישראל החדשה Reshet Yisra'el Ha-Ḥadasha), is the official projected coordinate system for Israel since 1998. It is based on the transverse Mercator map projection, optimized for Israel. ITM has replaced the old Israeli Cassini Soldner (ICS) coordinate system, also known as the Old Israel Grid (OIG).

== The need for a new grid ==
ITM replaced the Old Israel Grid, which was based on the Cassini-Soldner projection. ICS in turn was a simple modification of the Palestine grid used during the British mandate. The central meridian in the new projection, as in the old one, crosses through Jerusalem. The new grid has two main advantages. One is that the Transverse Mercator projection is better for navigation than Cassini-Soldner. The other is that ICS was based on a 19th-century reference ellipsoid (approximation of the shape of the Earth) and this was replaced by a more accurate approximation.

Additional information on the creation of the new grid is available in Hebrew.

== Examples ==
An ITM coordinate is generally given as a pair of six digit numbers (excluding any digits behind a decimal point which may be used in very precise surveying). The first number is always the Easting and the second is the Northing. The easting and northing are in metres from the false origin.

The ITM coordinate for the Western Wall in Jerusalem is 222286 632556, which means

E 222286 m
N 631556 m

The first figure is the easting and means that the location is 222,286 meters east from the false origin (along the X axis). The second figure is the northing and puts the location 631,556 meters north of the false origin (along the Y axis). Also notice how the easting in this example is indicated with an “E” and likewise an “N” for the northing.

The table below shows the same coordinate in 3 different grids:

Grid	Easting	Northing
PAL (Palestine grid)	172249	1131586
ICS (Israeli Cassini-Soldner)	172249	1131586
ITM (Israeli Transverse Mercator)	222286	631556
UTM (Universal Transverse Mercator)	711563	3518045

== Grid Parameters ==
The ITM coordinate system is defined by the following parameters:

Projection

Transverse Mercator

Reference ellipsoid

Ellipsoid	GRS80	
Semi-major axis a	6378137.000	meter
Inverse flattening (1/f)	298.257222100882711	

Origin Point

Latitude	31° 44' 03.8170" N
Longitude	35° 12' 16.2610" E

False Origin

False Easting	219529.584	meter
False Northing	626907.390	meter
Scale Factor	1.0000067	

=== Parameters for conversion to WGS84 ===
Reference ellipsoid

Ellipsoid	WGS84	
a	6378137	meter
1/f	298.257223563	

Shift

dX	-24.0024	meter
dY	-17.1032	meter
dZ	-17.8444	meter

Rotation

X	-0.33077	sec
Y	-1.85269	sec
Z	1.66969	sec

Scale

Scale	5.4248	ppm
