= Palestine grid =

Geographic coordinate system

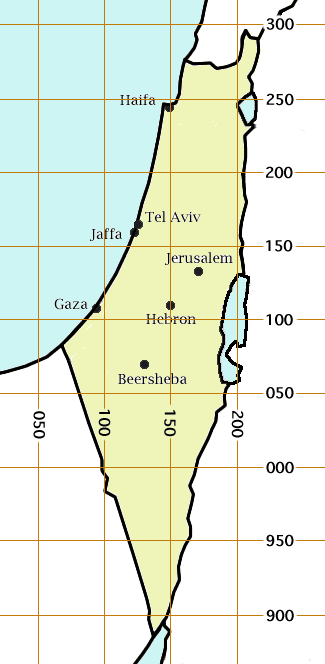
The Palestine Grid

The Palestine grid was the geographic coordinate system used by the Survey of Palestine department, under the British Mandate for Palestine.

The system was chosen by the Survey of Palestine Department of the British Mandate in 1922. The projection used was the Cassini-Soldner projection. The central meridian (the line of longitude along which there is no local distortion) was chosen as that passing through a marker on the hill of Mar Elias Monastery south of Jerusalem. The false origin (zero point) of the grid was placed 100 km to the south and west of the Ali el-Muntar hill that overlooks Gaza city. The unit length for the grid was the kilometre; the British units were not even considered.

At the time the grid was established, there was no intention of mapping the lower reaches of the Negev Desert, but this did not remain true. Those southern regions having a negative northing coordinate then became a source of confusion, which was solved by adding 1000 to the negative northings, running from about 900 to 1000 and from 0 to 300. For some military purposes, 1000 was added to the northing coordinates of all locations, so that they then ranged from about 900 to about 1300.

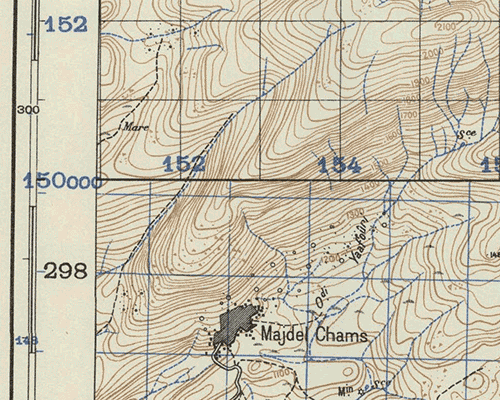
Portion of 1941 military map showing intersection of Palestine (blue lines) and Levant (black lines) grids near Majdal Shams

During World War II, a Military Palestine Grid was used that was similar to the Palestine Grid but used the transverse Mercator projection. The difference between the two projections was only a few metres.

After the establishment of the State of Israel, the Palestine grid continued to be used under the name of the Israel Grid or the Israeli Cassini Soldner (ICS) grid, now called the "Old Israeli Grid", with 1,000 km added to the northing component to make the northing range continuous. It was replaced by the Israeli Transverse Mercator grid in 1994. The Palestine grid is still commonly used to specify locations in the historical and archaeological literature.

== Specifying locations ==
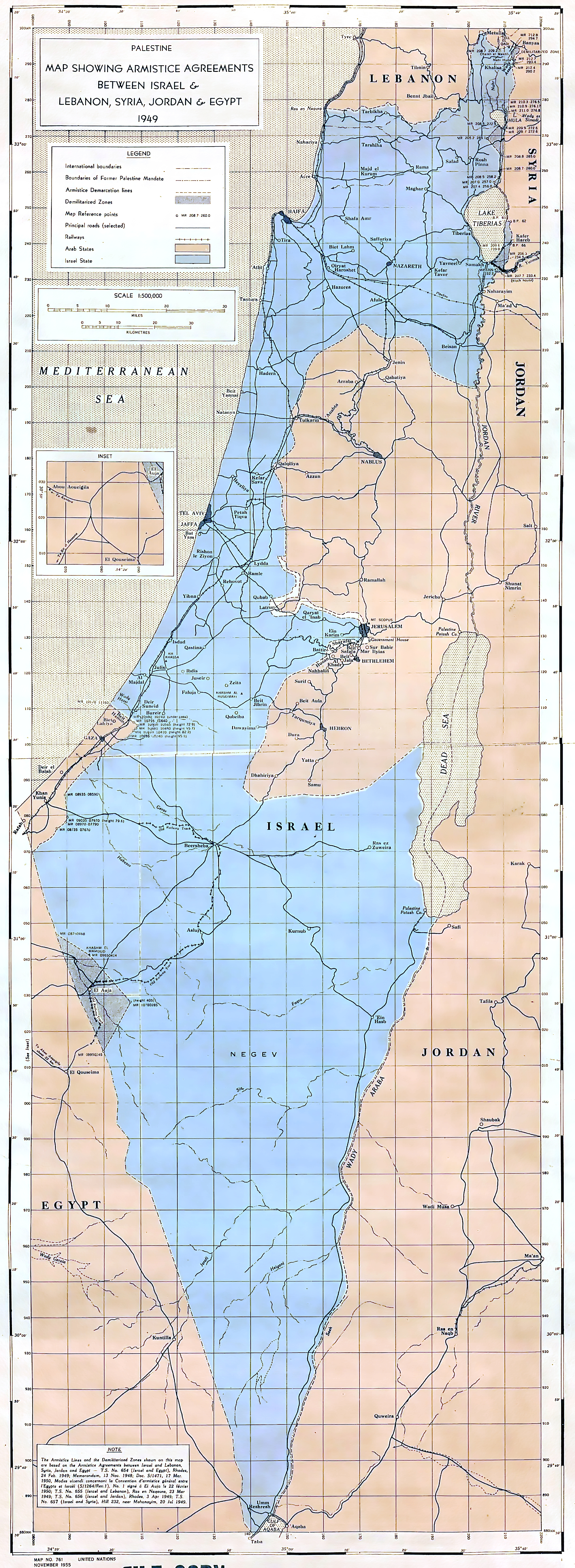
United Nations map showing the 1949 Armistice Agreements, with original map reference points ("MR") on the Palestine grid referenced in the respective agreements.

The basic way of specifying a location on the Palestine grid is to write the east–west coordinate followed by the north–south coordinate using 3 digits each. For example, the Dome of the Rock is at 172132. This specifies the location within one kilometre. If more precision is required, extra digits can be added to each coordinate; for example, 17241317 gives the Dome of the Rock to within 100 metres. Many authors separate the two coordinates with punctuation for readability purposes, for example 172-132 or 172/132.
