= ED50 =

Reference frame for European geodesy

ED50 ("European Datum 1950", EPSG:4230) is a geodetic datum which was defined after World War II for the international connection of geodetic networks.

== Background ==
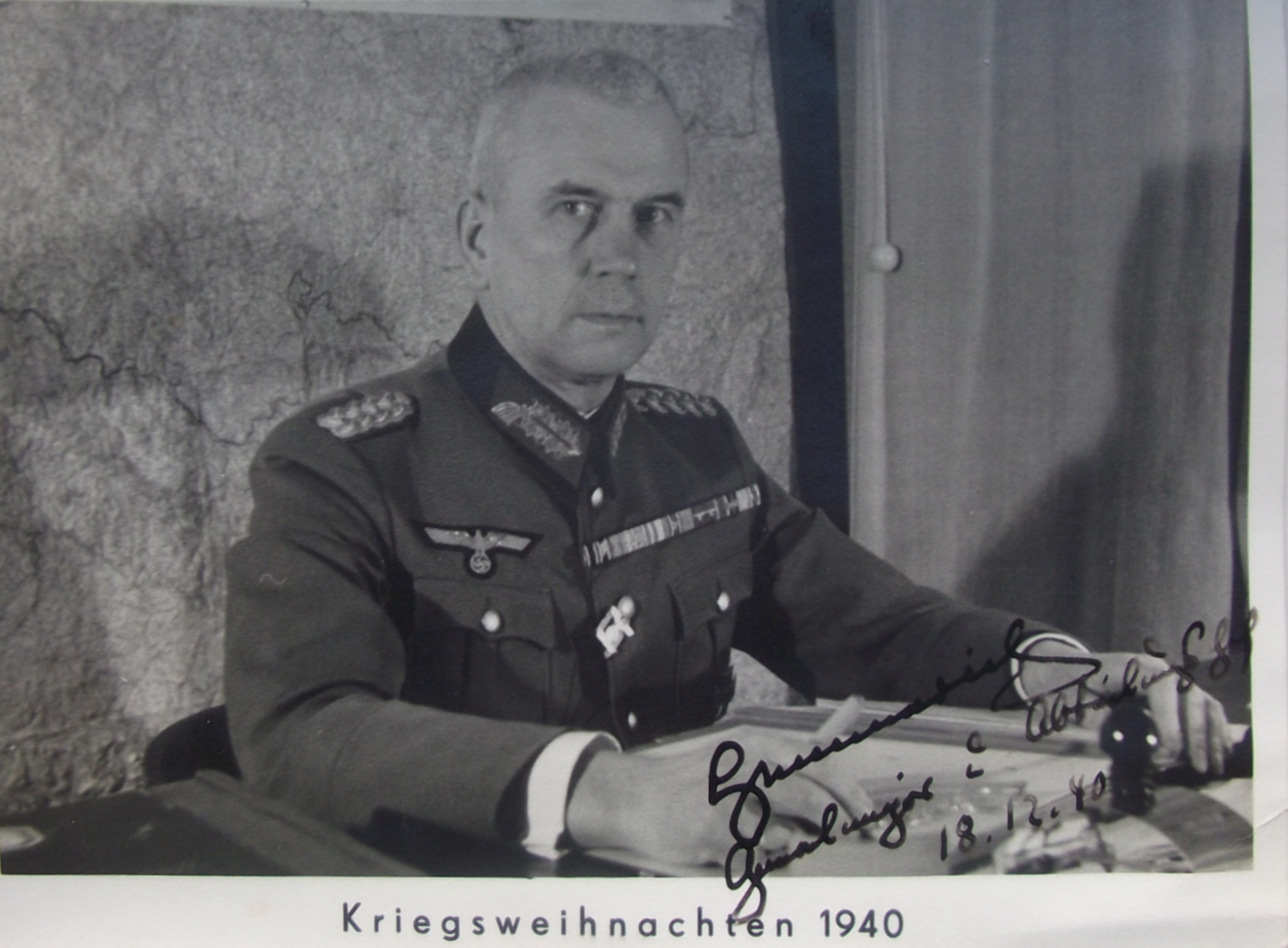
Gerlach Hemmerich

Some of the important battles of World War II were fought on the borders of Germany, the Netherlands, Belgium and France, and the mapping of these countries had incompatible latitude and longitude positioning. During the war the German Military Survey (Reichsamt Kriegskarten und Vermessungswesen), under the command of Lieutenant General Gerlach Hemmerich, began systematically mapping the portion of Europe under German military control. The Allies were also concerned about the state of mapping in Europe, and in 1944 the US Army Map Service set up an intelligence team to collect mapping and surveying information from the Germans as the allied armies moved through Europe after the Normandy landings. The group, known as Houghteam after Major Floyd W. Hough, collected much material. Their greatest success was in April 1945, when they found the entire geodetic archives of the German Army cached in Saalfeld, Thuringia. The shipment, 75 truckloads in all, was transferred to Bamberg, and then to Washington for evaluation.

Shortly afterward, the team captured the personnel of the Reichsamt für Landesaufnahme, the State Surveying Service, in Friedrichroda, Thuringia. This group had been working under renowned geodesist Professor Erwin Gigas to integrate the mapping of the occupied territories with that of Germany. They were directed to continue this work in US-occupied Bamberg, as part of the US-led effort to develop a single adjusted triangulation for Central Europe. This was completed in 1947. The work was then extended to cover much of Western Europe which was completed in 1950, and became ED50.

The European triangulation was originally classified military information. It was declassified in the 1960s, and became the basis for the definition of international boundaries in the North Sea. It remains used in much of Western Europe apart from Great Britain, Ireland, Sweden and Switzerland, which have their own datums.

ED50 used the International Ellipsoid of 1924 ("Hayford-Ellipsoid" of 1909) (radius of the Earth's equator 6378.388 km, flattening 1/297, both exact). The spheroid was an early attempt to model the entire Earth and was widely used around the world until the 1980s, when GRS 80 and WGS 84 were established.

Many national coordinate systems of Gauss–Krüger are defined by ED50 and oriented by means of geodetic astronomy. Up to now it has been used in databases of gravity fields, cadastre, small surveying networks in Europe and America, and by some developing countries with no modern baselines. ED50 was also part of the fundamentals of the NATO coordinates (Gauss–Krüger and UTM) up to the 1980s.

The geodetic datum of ED50 was centred at the Helmertturm on the Telegrafenberg in Potsdam, East Germany with the intent to encourage cooperation with European socialist states during the Cold War. The adjustments for later versions of the datum (ED77, ED79) used the Munich Frauenkirche as starting point.

== Datum shift between ED50 and WGS 84 ==
The longitude and latitude lines on the two datums are the same in the Arkhangelsk Oblast of north-west Russia. As one moves westwards across Europe, the longitude lines on ED50 gradually become further west than their WGS 84 equivalents, and are around 100 metres west in Spain and Portugal. Moving southwards, the latitude lines on ED50 gradually become further south than the WGS 84 lines, and are around 100 m south in the Mediterranean Sea.

This means that if the lines are further west, the longitude value of any given point becomes more easterly. Similarly, if the lines are south, the values become northerly. This is because the International Ellipsoid is larger than the GRS 80/WGS 84 ellipsoid, so a given north-south distance will cover more latitude on the new ellipsoid, and a given east-west distance will cover more longitude.

The datum shift for the Universal Transverse Mercator grid is different. The eastings vary between 0 m in Eastern Europe and 100 m in the far west of the continent, roughly similar to the longitude shift, but the northings are about 200 m different across Europe, with the ED50 UTM northing lines south of the WGS 84 UTM northing lines. UTM northings are measured from the Equator; distance from the equator to latitude 50 degrees is 112 m more on the International than on the WGS 84 spheroid.

== See also ==
- The French datum RGF93
- The Great Britain datum OSGB36.
- For Ireland, the Irish Transverse Mercator.
- The Swedish datum RT90.
- The Switzerland datum CH1903.
