= Israeli Cassini Soldner =

Historical geographic coordinate system

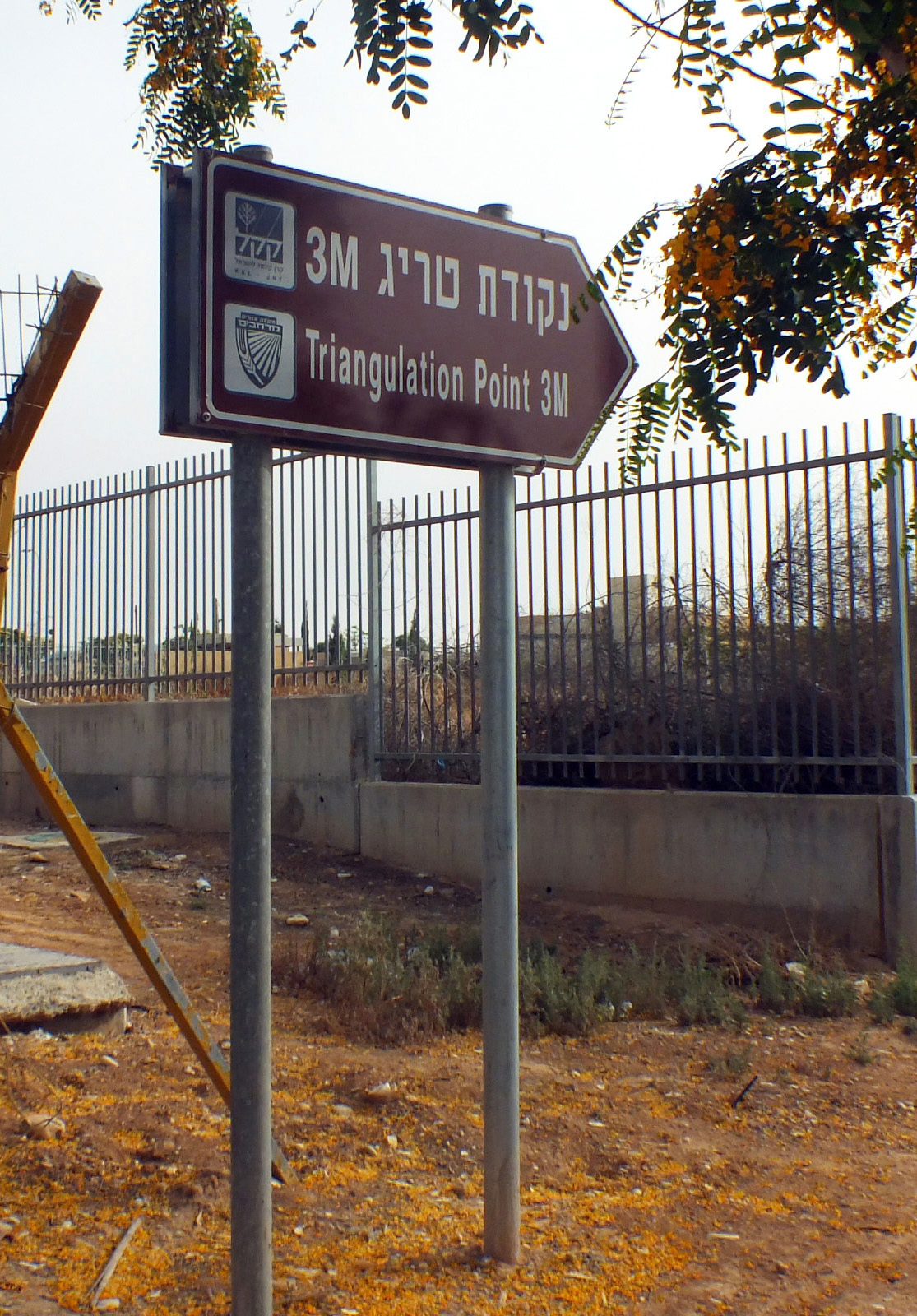
A trig station sign near Ofakim

Israeli Cassini Soldner (ICS), commonly known as the Old Israeli Grid (OIG; Hebrew: רשת ישראל הישנה Reshet Yisra'el Ha-Yeshana), is the old geographic coordinate system for Israel. The name is derived from the Cassini Soldner projection it uses and the fact that it is optimized for Israel. ICS has been mostly replaced by the new coordinate system Israeli Transverse Mercator (ITM), also known as the New Israeli Grid (NIG), but still referenced by older books and navigation software.

== History ==
The Cassini Soldner projection was used by the British Mandate of Palestine, when it was called the Palestine grid. The Palestine grid reached as south as Beer-Sheba. To avoid the existence of negative coordinates in the southern Negev, the False Northing of ICS was increased by 1000000. As a result, coordinates in the south of Israel are higher than 800000.

== Examples ==
An ICS coordinate is generally given as a pair of two numbers (excluding any digits behind a decimal point which may be used in very precise surveying). The first number is always the Easting and the second is the Northing. The easting and northing are in metres from the false origin. The easting is always a 6 digit number while the northing has 6 or 7 digits.

The ICS coordinate for the Western Wall at Jerusalem is:

E 172249 m
N 1131586 m

The first figure is the easting and means that the location is 172,249 meters east from the false origin (along the X axis). The second figure is the northing and puts the location 1,131,586 meters north of the false origin (along the Y axis). Also notice how the easting in this example is indicated with an “E” and likewise an “N” for the northing. The fact that the coordinate is in meters is indicated by the lowercase m.

The table below shows the same coordinate in 3 different grids:

Grid	Easting	Northing
ICS (Israeli Cassini Soldner)	172249	1131586
ITM (Israeli Transverse Mercator)	222286	631556
UTM (Universal Transverse Mercator)	711563	518045

== Grid parameters ==
The ICS coordinate system is defined by the following parameters:

- Projection: Cassini Soldner
- Reference ellipsoid: Clarke 80 Modified

a(m): 6378300.789
1/f: 293.466

- Main datum point values:

Latitude of origin (D-M-S): 31 44 2.748999999990644
Longitude of origin (D-M-S): 35 12 43.490000000012970

- Main point grid values:

False Easting (m): 170251.5549999999
False Northing(m): 1126867.909

- Grid scale factor: 1

== Sources ==
- Official ICS Grid Definition
- MAPI (Mapping Center of Israel) official website (Hebrew).
- Geography educational website of Haifa's university.
