= Mimee =

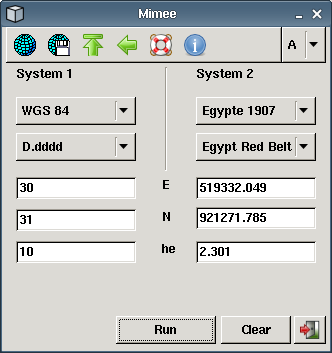
- Developer: Pierre Brial
- Stable release: 1.0
- Platform: Linux, Palm OS, AJAX (HTML/JavaScript)
- Available in: English
- Type: Geodesical software
- Licence: GNU GPL

Mimee is a program which can convert geographical coordinates between various datums and formats.

== Features ==
Supported coordinates formats are :

- Latitude and longitude in decimal degrees, degrees and decimal minutes, degrees-minutes-seconds, or grads
- Geocentric (or Cartesian) coordinates (XYZ)
- UTM
- Transverse Mercator, Oblique Mercator, and Conic.

232 datums and 36 grids are provided in Mimee.

== Compatibility ==
The online version is cross-platform. It can be used in any navigator in Linux, Mac, Windows, and in mobile phones. The stand-alone versions runs on Linux and Palm OS.
