= Transverse Mercator: Bowring series =

The Bowring series of the transverse mercator published in 1989 by Bernard Russel Bowring gave formulas for the Transverse Mercator that are simpler to program but retain millimeter accuracy.

Bowring rewrote the fourth order Redfearn series (after discarding small terms) in a more compact notation by replacing the spherical terms, i.e. those independent of ellipticity, by the exact expressions used in the spherical transverse Mercator projection. There was no gain in accuracy since the elliptic terms were still truncated at the 1mm level. Such modifications were of possible use when computing resources were minimal.

== Notation ==
$a$ = radius of the equator of the chosen spheroid (e.g. 6378137 m for GRS80/WGS84)

$b$ = polar semi-axis of the spheroid

$k_0$ = scale factor along the central meridian (e.g. 0.9996 for UTM)

$\scriptstyle \phi$ = latitude

$\scriptstyle \omega$ = difference in longitude from the central meridian, in radians, positive eastward

$m$ = meridian distance, measured on the spheroid from the equator to $\scriptstyle \phi$ (see below)

E = distance east of the central meridian, measured on the Transverse Mercator projection

N = distance north of the equator, measured on the Transverse Mercator projection

$$\varepsilon \; = \; \frac {2r - 1}{(r - 1)^2} = \; \frac{a^2 - b^2}{(b^2)} \;$$

where r is the reciprocal of the flattening for the chosen spheroid (for WGS84, r = 298.257223563 exactly).

== Convert Lat-Lon to Transverse Mercator ==
$$c = \cos \phi \qquad  s = \sin \phi$$

$\nu \; = \; a \sqrt{ \frac {1 + \varepsilon}{1 + \varepsilon c^2}}$ (prime vertical radius of curvature)

$$z = \frac {\varepsilon \omega^3 c^5 }{6}$$

$$\tan \theta_2 \; = \; \frac {2sc \sin^2 (\omega/2)}{s^2 + c^2 \cos \omega}$$

$$\text{E} \; = \; k_0 \nu \left [ {\tanh}^{-1} (c \sin \omega ) + z \left ( 1 + \frac {\omega^2}{10}(36 c^2 - 29)\right ) \right ]$$

$$\text{N} \; = \; k_0 \left [ m + \nu \theta_2 + \frac {z \nu \omega s}{4} (9 + 4 \varepsilon c^2 - 11 \omega^{2} + 20 (\omega^{2} c^2))\right ] \,$$

where $\theta_2$ is in radians and ${\tanh}^{-1}$ refers to arctanh).

== Transverse Mercator to Lat-Lon ==
To convert Transverse Mercator coordinates to lat-lon, first calculate $\scriptstyle \phi '$, the footprint latitude— i.e. the latitude of the point on the central meridian that has the same N as the point to be converted; i.e. the latitude that has a meridian distance on the spheroid equal to N/$k_0$. Bowring's formulas below seem quickest, but traditional formulas will suffice. Then

$$c_1 = \cos \phi ' \qquad s_1 = \sin \phi '$$

$$\nu_1 \; = \; a \sqrt{ \frac {1 + \varepsilon}{1 + \varepsilon {c_1}^2}}$$

$$x \; = \; \frac {\text{E}}{k_0 \nu_1}$$

$$\tan \theta_4 \; = \; \frac {\sinh x}{c_1}$$

$$\tan \theta_5 \; = \; \tan \phi ' \cos \theta_4$$

$$\phi \; = \; \left (1 + \varepsilon {c_1}^2 \right ) \left [ \theta_5 - \frac { \varepsilon }{24}x^4 \tan \phi '(9 - 10 {c_1} ^2) \right ] - \varepsilon {c_1}^2 \phi '$$

$$\omega \; = \; \theta_4 - \frac {\varepsilon}{60} x^3 c_1 \left ( 10 - \frac {4 x^2}{{c_1}^2} + x^2 {c_1}^2 \right )$$

($\theta_4$, $\theta_5$ and $\scriptstyle \phi '$ must of course be in radians, and $\scriptstyle \phi$ and $\omega$ will be.)

== Meridian distance ==
Bowring gave formulas for meridian distance (the distance from the equator to the given latitude along a north–south line on the spheroid) that seem to be correct within 0.001 millimeter on earth-size spheroids. The symbol n is the same as in the Redfearn formulas

$$n \; = \; \frac {a - b}{a + b} \; = \; \frac {1}{2r - 1}$$

$$\tan \psi \quad = \quad \left ( \frac {r - 1}{r} \right ) \tan \phi \quad = \quad \left ( \frac {1 - n}{1 + n} \right ) \tan \phi$$

$$p = 1 - \frac {3}{4} n \cos 2 \psi \qquad q = \frac {3}{4} n \sin 2 \psi$$

$$Z = \left(1 - \frac {3}{8}n^2\right)(p + qi)^{2/3}\qquad\text{ where }\; i = \sqrt{-1}$$

Discard the real part of the complex number Z; subtract the real coefficient of the imaginary part of Z from $\psi$ (in radians) to get $\theta$. Then

$$\text{meridian distance} \; = \quad \frac{a \theta}{1+n}\left(1 + \frac {n^2}{8}\right)^2$$

(Note that if latitude is 90 degrees, then $\theta = \frac {\pi}{2}$ , which, it turns out, gives the length of a meridian quadrant to a trillionth of a meter on GRS 80.)

For the inverse (given meridian distance, calculate latitude), calculate $\theta$ using the last formula above, then

$$p' = 1 - \frac{33}{20}n \cos 2 \theta \qquad q' = \frac{33}{20} n \sin 2 \theta$$

$$Z' = \frac {5}{4}\left(1 - \frac{9}{16}n^2\right)(p' + q'i)^{8/33}$$

Discard the real part of Z' and add the real coefficient of i to $\theta$ to get the reduced latitude $\psi$ (in radians) which converts to latitude $\scriptstyle \phi$ using the equation at the top of this section.

== If Zero is not at the Equator ==
As given above, all the formulas for the ellipsoid assume that the Northing on the Transverse Mercator projection starts from zero at the Equator, as it does in the northern-hemisphere UTM projection. People using the British National Grid, or State Plane Coordinates in the United States, have an additional step in their calculations.

The British National Grid sets Northing at (latitude 49 degrees North, longitude 2 degrees West) to be -100,000 meters exactly. It uses the Airy spheroid, with equatorial radius being 6377563.39603 meters and the reciprocal of the flattening being 299.3249645938 (both values being rounded); the meridian distance from the equator to 49 degrees latitude therefore calculates to 5429228.602 meters on the spheroid. Rounded scale factor at longitude 2 degrees west is 0.999601271775, so on the Transverse Mercator projection 49 degrees North is 5427063.8153 meters from the Equator.

So when converting lat-lon to British National Grid, use the formulas given above and subtract 5527063.815 meters from the calculated N.

== Example: convert lat-lon to UTM ==
NGS says the Washington Monument is 38 deg 53 min 22.08269 sec North, 77 deg 02 min 06.86575 sec West on NAD83; what's its UTM?

As with all NAD83 calculations we use the GRS80 spheroid with a = 6378137 meters exactly and r = 298.25722 2101 rounded. If we lazily take that value of r as exact we get $\epsilon$ = 0.00673 94967 75479 and n = 0.00167 92203 94629. As with all UTM calculations $k_0$ is 0.9996 exactly.

$\scriptstyle \nu$ is 6386568.5027 meters at the monument's latitude
z is -1.43831 52572 times $10^{-8}$ at the monument

$\theta_2$ comes out -0.00030 83836 79455 61242 radians.

Next get m, the meridian distance from the equator to the monument:
$\psi$ is 38.795469019 degrees = 0.677108669 radians
so p = 0.99972936, q = 0.00122999 and the imaginary part of Z is 0.000820069 times i.
Subtract 0.000820069 from 0.677108669 to get $\theta$ = 0.676288601 radians and m is 4306233.2730 meters.

Plug all of that in and we get N = 4306479.5101 meters, E = -176516.8552 meters; add the latter to 500000 (the Easting value along the central meridian in all UTM zones) to get UTM Easting of 323483.1448 meters, which agrees with the NGS datasheet.
