= Cassini Grid =

Coordinate system used on British military maps

The Cassini Grid was a grid coordinate system used on British military maps during the first half of the twentieth century, particularly during World War II. The referencing consists of square grids drawn on a Cassini projection. For a period after the war, the maps were also used by the general public. The system has been superseded by the Ordnance Survey National Grid.

== History ==
The Cassini Grid system was introduced in 1927 for maps of the United Kingdom for the British military. It is so called from the use of Cassini map projection. It modified and replaced a grid coordinate system first deployed in 1919 known as the British System. The Cassini Grid system is thus more properly called the Modified British System. It may also be referred to as Military Grid, War Office Grid, or Purple Grid (due to the grid colour on some issues of maps). It continued in use until some time after World War II.

After the war, the Cassini Grid system was replaced with the Ordnance Survey National Grid (see § Transition to National Grid). However, the Cassini Grid system continued to be used to map colonial possessions into the 1960s. Hong Kong, for instance, was surveyed in 1962 for a series of 1:10,000 and 1:25,000 maps of the territory. These were published between 1965 and 1972.

== Notation ==
The map is divided into a grid of 500 km squares. The squares covering England are Q, R, V and W with an intersection somewhere between York and Thirsk. Ireland is covered by square I, but the Irish grid is tilted slightly to the East relative to the English grid. Each 500 km square is further divided into 25 100 km squares. The 100 km squares are also given letters (with I omitted). The full designation for a grid square is the 500 km letter in lowercase followed by the 100 km letter in uppercase. For instance, the squares covering London are wL and wQ.

Each 100 km square is subdivided into 10 km squares, and each of these is further subdivided into 1 km squares. These squares are numbered according to eastings and northings, that is, counting from the south-west corner of the 100 km square. For instance, the grid reference 25 76 refers to a 1 km square within the 10 km square 2 7. That is, it is two squares across and seven squares up (counting from zero) from the reference corner. Greater precision can be obtained by using six, eight, or even more digits, but always an even number with the same precision on both coordinates.

The complete grid reference includes both the grid square letters and the numerical reference giving the location within the grid square. For instance, wQ 683 825 is a location in South London. Grid references can also be given in an all numeral notation. To do this, square vV (the South-West corner of the grid out in the Atlantic) is taken as square zero and then the grid squares are counted from there to the location being referenced. For instance qY 985 613 (somewhere around Carlisle) can also be expressed as 3985 5613. This is because square qY is three 100 km squares East of square vV and five 100 km squares North of vV. However, it is frequently not necessary to explicitly give the grid square at all, this can be implied from context.

== Transition to National Grid ==
The Ordnance Survey National Grid was introduced in 1938 and the intention was to replace the Cassini Grid system with this. However, it had not become established when World War II broke out and the Cassini Grid continued in use throughout the war. Work on the National Grid maps stopped for the duration of the war. In fact, progress went backwards due to the Southampton offices of the Ordnance Survey being bombed by the Germans in 1940 destroying some of their data.

National Grid maps began to be issued after the war, but it was some time before there was full coverage. In the interim, the public were allowed to purchase War Office Cassini Grid maps. National Grid maps at 1:25,000 scale (often referred to as 2 1/2 inches to the mile, or just 2 1/2-inch maps) were not introduced until as late as 1950. Cassini Grid maps at this scale had been available, but apparently the public were discouraged from using them by the Ordnance Survey. They were poor quality, rushed into production for wartime needs, and had been produced by merely photographically reducing six-inch maps.

The long period of introduction of the National Grid resulted in National Grid and Cassini Grid maps being used side by side for an extended time. Converting between the two systems is problematic. Although the two grids are superficially similar (both use 100 km squares), different projections, baselines and origins make the conversion non-trivial. Conversion of Cassini Grid references is of interest to modern archaeologists attempting to locate wartime sites and artefacts.

== See also ==
- Military Grid Reference System
