= Swedish grid =

The Swedish grid (in Swedish Rikets Nät, RT 90) is a coordinate system that was previously used for government maps in Sweden. RT 90 is a slightly modified version of the RT 38 from 1938. RT 90 has been replaced with SWEREF 99 as the official Swedish spatial reference system.

While the system could be used with negative numbers to represent all four "quarters" of the earth (NE, NW, SE, and SW hemispheres), the standard application of RT 90 is only useful for the northern half of the eastern hemisphere where numbers are positive. The coordinate system is based on metric measures rooting from the crossing of the Prime Meridian and the Equator at 0,0. The Central Meridian used to be based on a meridian located at the old observatory in Stockholm, but today it is based on the Prime Meridian at Greenwich. The numbering system's first digit represents the largest distance, followed by what can be seen as fractional decimal digits (though without an explicit decimal point). Therefore, X 65 is located halfway between X 6 and X 7. The coordinate grid is specified using two numbers, named X and Y, X being the south–north axis and Y the west–east axis. Two seven-digit numbers are sufficient to specify a location with a one m resolution.

Example: X=6620000 Y=1317000 (X is the northing and Y is the easting) denotes a position 6620 km north of the Equator and -183 km (1317 km-1500 km) west of the Central Meridian, which happens to be somewhere near the town center of Arvika.

== RT90 Map Projection Parameters ==
Parameter	Value
Reference Ellipsoid	Bessel 1841
Semi Major Axis	6377397.155 m
Inverse Flattening (1/f)	299.1528128
Type of Projection	Gauss-Krüger (Transverse Mercator)
Central Meridian:	E15°48'29.8" (2.5 gon West of the Stockholm Observatory)
Latitude of Origin	0°
Scale on Central Meridian	1.0
False Northing	0 m
False Easting	1500000 m
