= Cassini projection =

Cylindrical equidistant map projection

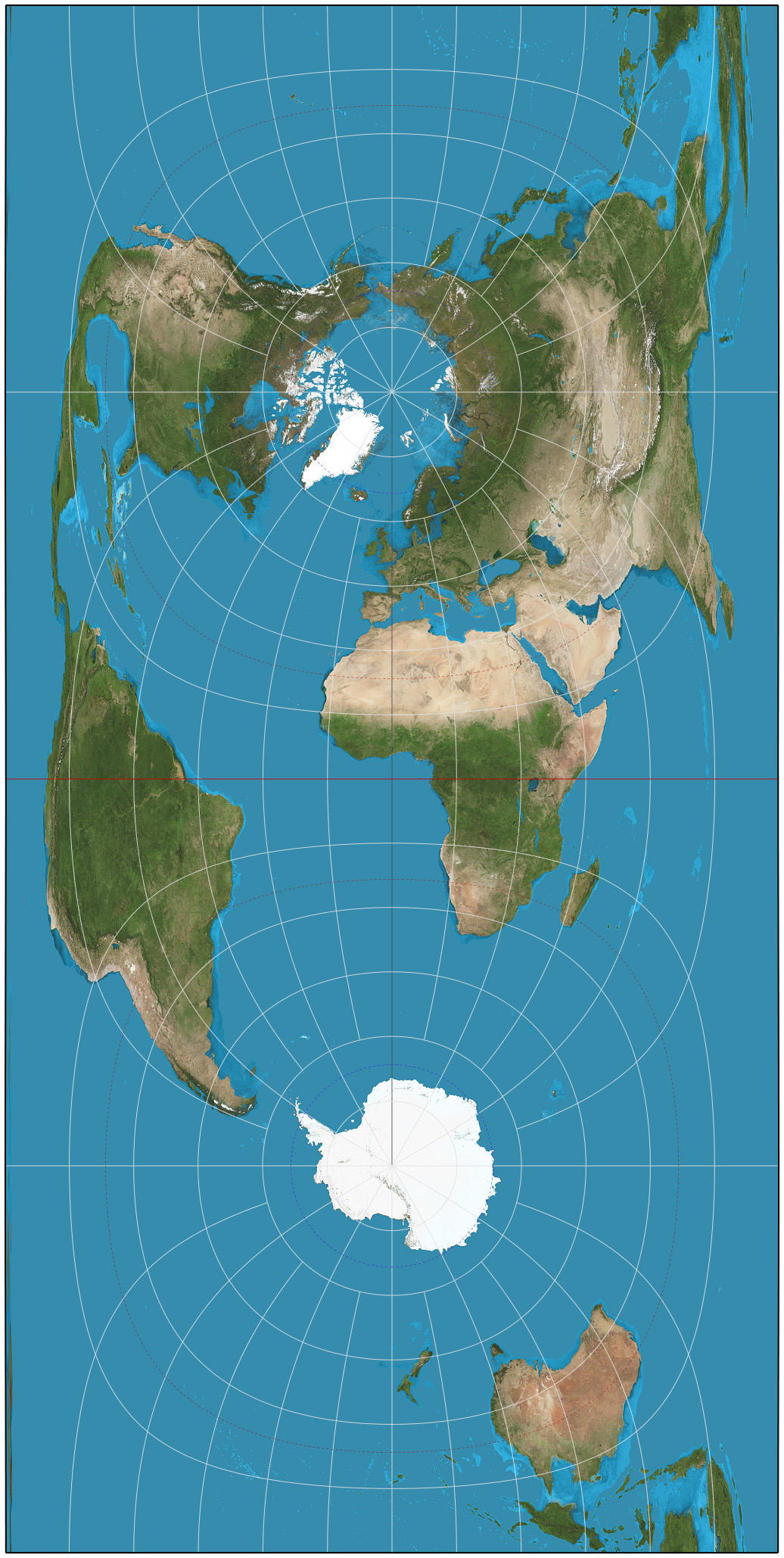
Cassini projection of the world

Cassini projection with 1,000 km indicatrices

The Cassini projection (also sometimes known as the Cassini–Soldner projection or Soldner projection) is a map projection first described in an approximate form by César-François Cassini de Thury in 1745. Its precise formulas were found through later analysis by Johann Georg von Soldner around 1810. It is the transverse aspect of the equirectangular projection, in that the globe is first rotated so the central meridian becomes the "equator", and then the normal equirectangular projection is applied.

Considering the earth as a sphere, the projection is composed of the operations:
$$x = \arcsin(\cos \varphi \sin \lambda)$$
$$\begin{align}
y & = \operatorname{atan2}(\sin \varphi, \cos \varphi \cos \lambda)\\
& = \arctan\left(\frac{\tan\varphi}{\cos\lambda}\right) \qquad \text{restricted to } -\tfrac{\pi}{2} < \lambda < \tfrac{\pi}{2}.
\end{align}$$
where λ is the longitude from the central meridian and φ is the latitude. When programming these equations, the inverse tangent function used is actually the atan2 function, with the first argument sin φ and the second cos φ cos λ.

The reverse operation is composed of the operations:
$$\varphi = \arcsin(\sin y \cos x) \qquad \lambda = \operatorname{atan2}(\tan x, \cos y).$$

In practice, the projection has always been applied to models of the earth as an ellipsoid, which greatly complicates the mathematical development but is suitable for surveying. Nevertheless, the use of the Cassini projection has largely been superseded by the transverse Mercator projection, at least with central mapping agencies.

== Distortions ==
Areas along the central meridian, and at right angles to it, are not distorted. Elsewhere, the distortion is largely in a north–south direction, and varies by the square of the distance from the central meridian. As such, the greater the longitudinal extent of the area, the worse the distortion becomes.

Due to this, the Cassini projection works best for areas with greater north–south extent than east–west. For example, Ordnance Survey maps of Great Britain used the Cassini projection from 1924 until the introduction of the National Grid.

== Elliptical form ==
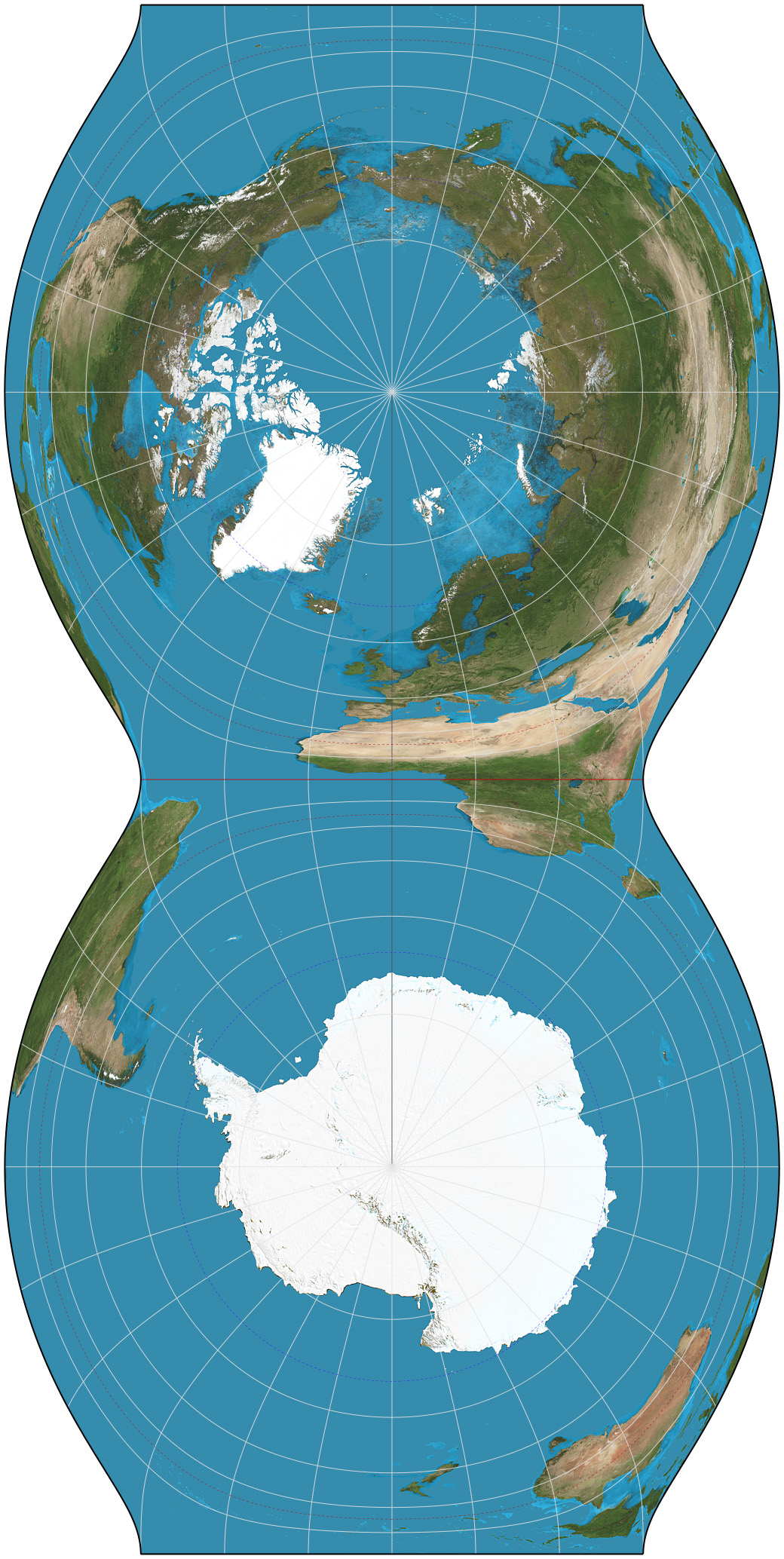
Cassini projection of the world modeled as a highly oblate ellipsoid with flattening 1:2 (= eccentricity √3/2)

Cassini is known as a spherical projection, but can be generalised as an elliptical form.

Considering the earth as an ellipse, the projection is composed of these operations:
$$N = (1 - e^2 \sin^2 \varphi)^{-1/2}$$
$$T = \tan^2 \varphi$$
$$A = \lambda \cos \varphi$$
$$C = \frac{e^2}{1-e^2} \cos^2 \varphi$$
$$x = N \left( A - T \frac{A^3}{6} - (8-T+8C)T\frac{A^5}{120} \right)$$
$$y = M(\varphi) - M(\varphi_0) + (N \tan \varphi) \left(\frac{A^2}{2} + (5-T+6C)\frac{A^4}{24} \right)$$
and $M$ is the meridional distance function.

The reverse operation is composed of the operations:
$$\varphi' = M^{-1}(M(\varphi_0)+y)$$

If $\varphi' = \frac{\pi}{2}$ then $\varphi=\varphi'$ and $\lambda=0.$

Otherwise calculate $T$ and $N$ as above with $\varphi'$, and
$$R = (1 - e^2)(1 - e^2 \sin^2 \varphi')^{-3/2}$$
$$D = x/N$$
$$\varphi = \varphi' - \frac{N \tan \varphi'}{R}\left(\frac{D^2}{2}-(1+3T)\frac{D^4}{24}\right)$$
$$\lambda = \frac{D - T\frac{D^3}{3} + (1+3T)T\frac{D^5}{15}}{\cos \varphi'}$$

== See also ==
- Cassini Grid
