= Geodetic coordinates =

Geographic coordinate system

Geodetic coordinates P(ɸ,λ,h)

Geodetic coordinates are a type of curvilinear orthogonal coordinate system used in geodesy based on a reference ellipsoid. They include geodetic latitude (north/south) ϕ, longitude (east/west) λ, and ellipsoidal height h (also known as geodetic height). The triad is also known as Earth ellipsoidal coordinates (not to be confused with ellipsoidal-harmonic coordinates).

== Definitions ==
Longitude measures the rotational angle between the zero meridian and the measured point. By convention for the Earth, Moon and Sun, it is expressed in degrees ranging from −180° to +180°. For other bodies a range of 0° to 360° is used. For this purpose, it is necessary to identify a zero meridian, which for Earth is usually the Prime Meridian. For other bodies a fixed surface feature is usually referenced, which for Mars is the meridian passing through the crater Airy-0. It is possible for many different coordinate systems to be defined upon the same reference ellipsoid.

Geodetic latitude measures how close to the poles or equator a point is along a meridian, and is represented as an angle from −90° to +90°, where 0° is the equator. The geodetic latitude is the angle between the equatorial plane and a line that is normal to the reference ellipsoid. Depending on the flattening, it may be slightly different from the geocentric latitude, which is the angle between the equatorial plane and a line from the center of the ellipsoid. For non-Earth bodies the terms planetographic latitude and planetocentric latitude are used instead.

Ellipsoidal height (or ellipsoidal altitude), also known as geodetic height (or geodetic altitude), is the distance between the point of interest and the ellipsoid surface, evaluated along the ellipsoidal normal vector; it is defined as a signed distance such that points inside the ellipsoid have negative height.

== Geodetic vs. geocentric coordinates ==
The definition of geodetic latitude (ϕ) and geocentric latitude (θ)

Geodetic latitude and geocentric latitude have different definitions. Geodetic latitude is defined as the angle between the equatorial plane and the surface normal at a point on the ellipsoid, whereas geocentric latitude is defined as the angle between the equatorial plane and a radial line connecting the centre of the ellipsoid to a point on the surface (see figure). When used without qualification, the term latitude refers to geodetic latitude. For example, the latitude used in geographic coordinates is geodetic latitude. The standard notation for geodetic latitude is φ. There is no standard notation for geocentric latitude; examples include θ, ψ, φ′.

Similarly, geodetic altitude is defined as the height above the ellipsoid surface, normal to the ellipsoid; whereas geocentric altitude is defined as the distance to the reference ellipsoid along a radial line to the geocenter. When used without qualification, as in aviation, the term altitude refers to geodetic altitude (possibly with further refinements, such as in orthometric heights). Geocentric altitude is typically used in orbital mechanics (see orbital altitude).

If the impact of Earth's equatorial bulge is not significant for a given application (e.g., interplanetary spaceflight), the Earth ellipsoid may be simplified as a spherical Earth, in which case the geocentric and geodetic latitudes are equal and the latitude-dependent geocentric radius simplifies to a global mean Earth's radius (see also: spherical coordinate system).

== Conversion ==
Given geodetic coordinates, one can compute the geocentric Cartesian coordinates of the point as follows:

$$\begin{align}
X &= \big( N + h\big)\cos{\phi}\cos{\lambda} \\
Y &= \big( N + h\big)\cos{\phi}\sin{\lambda} \\
Z &= \left( \frac{b^2}{a^2} N + h\right)\sin{\phi}
\end{align}$$

where a and b are the equatorial radius (semi-major axis) and the polar radius (semi-minor axis), respectively. N is the prime vertical radius of curvature, function of latitude ϕ:

$$N = \frac{a^2}{\sqrt{a^2\cos^2\phi + b^2\sin^2 \phi }},$$

In contrast, extracting ϕ, λ and h from the rectangular coordinates usually requires iteration as ϕ and h are mutually involved through N:

$$\lambda = \operatorname{atan2}(Y,X)$$.
$$h=\frac{p}{\cos\phi} - N,$$
$$\phi = \arctan\left( (Z / p)/(1 - e^2 N / (N + h)) \right).$$

where $p = \sqrt{X^2 + Y^2}$. More sophisticated methods are available.

== See also ==
- Local geodetic coordinates
- Geodetic datum
- Geodesics on an ellipsoid
- Planetary coordinate system
