= Irish Transverse Mercator =

Coordinate system for Ireland

ITM coordinates on an OSi map from 2006. In this example the easting and the northing are separated by a comma.

An illustration of ITM coordinates over a map of Ireland. Eastings are on the top/bottom. Northings are on the right/left.

Irish Transverse Mercator (ITM) is the official projected coordinate system for Ireland. It was implemented jointly by the Ordnance Survey Ireland (OSi) and the Ordnance Survey of Northern Ireland (OSNI) in 2001. It is based on the transverse Mercator map projection, optimised for the island of Ireland.

== History ==
The older Irish grid reference system required GPS measurements to be "translated" (using co-ordinate transformations). The more precise the GPS measurements were, the more the translation process introduced inaccuracies.

While the existing UTM co-ordinate system partly fulfilled the requirement for direct GPS compatibility it had some drawbacks, including varying levels of distortion across the island due to the central meridian being at the west coast of Ireland.

The new system needed to satisfy various criteria: GPS compatibility, map distortion for the whole island of Ireland had to be minimal, it was to be conformal and backward compatible with existing mapping. A customised Transverse Mercator projection was chosen.

ITM and the older more established Irish Grid will (initially at least) be used in parallel. As a result, ITM coordinates had to be obviously different so users would not confuse the two. This was done by shifting the ITM false origin further into the Atlantic and thereby creating substantially different co-ordinate numbers for any given location.

While OSi and OSNI intend to supply map information in the older Irish Grid format into the future, the Irish Institution of Surveyors has recommended that ITM be adopted as soon as possible as the preferred official co-ordinate system for Ireland.

== Examples ==
An ITM co-ordinate is generally given as a pair of two six-digit numbers (excluding any digits behind a decimal point which may be used in very precise surveying). The first number is always the easting and the second is the northing. The easting and northing are in metres from the false origin.

The ITM co-ordinate for the Spire of Dublin on O'Connell Street is:

715830, 734697

The first figure is the easting and means that the location is 715,830 metres east from the false origin (along the X axis). The second figure is the northing and puts the location 734,697 metres north of the false origin (along the Y axis)

The equivalent Irish Grid co-ordinate for the same location is:

315904, 234671 or O1590434671

The Spire of Dublin example provides a fix for a location that is accurate to 1 metre. With ITM it is possible to give a more accurate co-ordinate for a given location by using a decimal point after the initial six figure easting and northing.

The ITM co-ordinate for the passive GPS station at the OSi office is:

E 709885.081m, N 736167.699m

This ITM co-ordinate has three digits behind the decimal point which gives a fix for a location with millimetre accuracy. Also notice how the easting in this example is indicated with an "E" and likewise an "N" for the northing. The fact that the co-ordinate is in metres is indicated by the lowercase m.

With ITM there is no provision for using myriad letters and truncated coordinates as there is with the Irish Grid. Every co-ordinate must be given with at least a six-digit easting and northing from the false origin.

== Comparison of ITM, Irish Grid and UTM ==
	ITM	Irish Grid	UTM 29
Reference ellipsoid:	GRS80	Airy Modified	GRS80
Central Meridian:	8° West	8° West	9° West
Scale on Central Meridian:	0.999 820	1.000 035	0.999 600
True Origin:	53° 30' North; 8° West	53° 30' North; 8° West	0° 00' North; 9° West
False Origin:	600,000m West; 750,000m South	200,000m West; 250,000m South	500,000m West; 0m South
Vertical Datum:	Malin Head	Malin Head	?
EPSG Code:	2157	29902	32629

== See also ==
- ETRS89
- GRS80
- Spatial reference system
