= United States National Grid =

Multi-purpose grid reference system used in the United States

The United States National Grid (USNG) is functionally and operationally equivalent to the Military Grid Referencing System (MGRS), specified by the U.S. military for tactical (local/regional) operations. The USNG provides a multi-purpose location system for civilian use in the United States, especially to support emergency services. Like the MGRS, it provides a nationally consistent "language of location", based on Universal Transverse Mercator (UTM) coordinates, optimized for local applications, in a compact, user-friendly format. It is similar in design to the UTM-based national grid reference systems used in other countries.

The USNG was adopted as a national standard by the Federal Geographic Data Committee (FGDC) of the US Government in 2001. The MGRS is the foundation of the USNG and both should be considered technically synonymous for all practical purposes. Please refer to the Wikipedia MGRS page for more detailed background information on the technical origins of that grid system. Information provided here should be considered supplemental to that which is provided for the MGRS, with a focus on the United States and civilian applications. There are many other resources available related to “grid referencing” and “land navigation”, which typically use UTM-based systems, like MGRS or USNG, which are all interoperable.

== Overview ==
While latitude and longitude are well suited to describing locations over large areas of the Earth's surface, most practical land navigation situations occur within much smaller, local areas. As such, they are often better served by a local Cartesian coordinate system, in which the coordinates represent actual distance units on the ground, using the same units of measurement from two perpendicular coordinate axes. This can improve human comprehension by providing reference of scale, as well as making actual distance computations more efficient.

Paper maps often are published with overlaid rectangular (as opposed to latitude/longitude) grids to provide a reference to identify locations. However, these grids, if non-standard or proprietary (such as so-called "bingo" grids with references such as "B-4"), are typically not interoperable with each other, nor can they usually be used with GPS.

The goal of the USNG is to provide a uniform, nationally consistent rectangular grid system that is interoperable across maps at different scales, as well as with GPS and other location based systems. It is intended to provide a frame of reference for describing and communicating locations that is easier to use than latitude/longitude for many practical applications, works across jurisdictional boundaries, and is simple to learn, teach, and use. It is also designed to be both flexible and scalable so that location references are as compact and concise as possible.

The USNG is intended to supplement—not to replace—other location systems such as street addresses. It can be applied to printed maps and to computer mapping and other Geographic Information System (GIS) applications. It has found increasing acceptance especially in emergency management, search and rescue, and other public safety applications; yet, its utility is by no means limited to those fields.

== Description and functioning ==
The USNG is an alpha-numeric reference system that overlays the UTM coordinate system. A number of brief tutorial references explain the system in detail, with examples.. Briefly, an example of a full USNG spatial address (grid reference) is:

18S UJ 23371 06519

(This example used by the FGDC is the full one-meter grid reference of the Jefferson Pier in Washington DC.)

This full form (15 characters) uniquely identifies a single one-meter grid square out of the entire surface of the earth. It consists of three parts (each of which follows a "read-right-then-up" paradigm familiar with other "X,Y" coordinates):

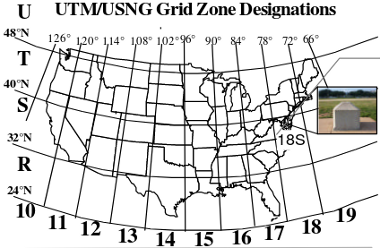
USNG Grid Zone Designations (CONUS)

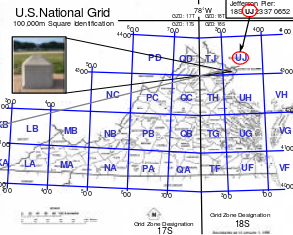
USNG 100 km Square IDs

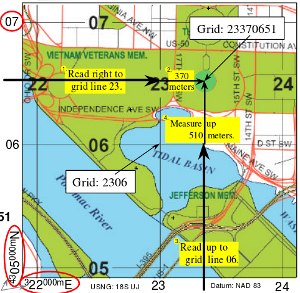
USNG Grid Coordinates: "Read right, then up" as actual distances (locally, within a 100 km square)

1. Grid Zone Designation (GZD); for a world-wide unique address. This consists of up to 2 digits (6-degree longitude UTM zone) for West to East, followed by a letter (8-degree latitude band) from South to North; in this example, "18S".
2. 100,000-meter (100 km) Square Identification; for regional areas. This consists of two letters, the first West to East, the second South to North; in this example, "UJ".
3. Grid Coordinates; for local areas. This part consists of an even number of digits, in this example, 23371 06519, and specifies a location within the 100 km grid square, relative to its lower-left corner. Split in half, the first part (here 23371), called the "easting", gives the displacement east of the left edge of the square; the second part (here 06519), called the "northing"), gives a distance north of the bottom edge of the containing square.
  - Users determine the required precision, so a grid reference is typically truncated to fewer than the full 10 digits when less precision is required. These values represent a point position (southwest corner) for an area of refinement:
    - Ten digits..... 23371 06519 ..Locating a point within a 1 m square
    - Eight digits..... 2337 0651 ...Locating a point within a 10 m square
    - Six digits......... 233 065 .....Locating a point within a 100 m square
    - Four digits......... 23 06 .......Locating a point within a 1000 m (1 km) square
    - Two digits........... 2 0 .........Locating a point within a 10000 m (10 km) square
  - Note that when going from a higher- to a lower-precision grid reference, it is important to truncate rather than round when removing the unneeded digits. Because one is always measuring from the lower-left corner of the 100 km square, this ensures that a lower-precision grid reference is a square that contains all of the higher-precision references contained within it.

In addition to truncating references (on the right) when less precision is required, another powerful feature of USNG is the ability to omit (on the left) the Grid Zone Designation, and possibly even the 100 km Square Identification, when one or both of these are unambiguously understood; that is, when operating within a known regional or local area. For example:

- Full USNG: 18S UJ 23371 06519 (world-wide unique reference to 1 meter precision)
- Without Grid Zone Designation: UJ 2337 0651 (when regional area is understood; here to 10 meter precision)
- Without 100 km Square Identification: 233 065 (when local area is understood; here to 100 meter precision)

Thus in practical usage, USNG references are typically very succinct and compact, making them convenient (and less error prone) for communication.

== History ==
Rectangular, distance-based (Cartesian) coordinate systems have long been recognized for their practical utility for land measurement and geolocation over local areas. In the United States, the Public Land Survey System (PLSS), created in 1785 in order to survey land newly ceded to the nation, introduced a rectangular coordinate system to improve on the earlier metes-and-bounds survey basis used earlier in the original colonies. In the first half of the 20th century, State Plane Coordinate Systems (SPCS) brought the simplicity and convenience of Cartesian coordinates to state-level areas, providing high accuracy (low distortion) survey-grade coordinates for use primarily by state and local governments. (Both of these planar systems remain in use today for specialized purposes.)

Internationally, during the period between World Wars I and II, several European nations mapped their territory with national-scale grid systems optimized for the geography of each country, such as the Ordnance Survey National Grid (British National Grid). Near the end of World War II, the Universal Transverse Mercator (UTM) coordinate system extended this grid concept around the globe, dividing it into 60 zones of 6 degrees longitude each. Circa 1949, the US further refined UTM for ease of use (and combined it with the Universal Polar Stereographic system covering polar areas) to create the Military Grid Reference System (MGRS), which remains the geocoordinate standard used across the militaries of NATO counties.

In the 1990s, a US grass-roots citizen effort led to the Public X-Y Mapping Project, a not-for-profit organization created specifically to promote the acceptance of a national grid for the United States. The Public XY Mapping Project developed the idea, conducting informal tests and surveys to determine which coordinate reference system best met the requirements of national consistency and ease of human use. Based on its findings, a standard based on the MGRS was adopted and brought to the Federal Geographic Data Committee (FGDC) in 1998. After an iterative review process and public comment period, the USNG was adopted by the FGDC as standard FGDC-STD-011-2001 in December 2001.

Since then, the USNG has seen gradual but steadily increasing adoption both in formal standards and in practical use and applications, in public safety and in other fields.

== Advantages over latitude/longitude ==
Users encountering the USNG (or similar grid reference systems) sometimes question why they are used instead of latitude and longitude coordinates, with which they may be more familiar. Proponents note that, in contrast to latitude and longitude coordinates, the USNG provides:

- Coordinate units that represent actual distances on the ground
- Equal distance units in both east–west and north–south directions
- An intuitive sense of scale and distance, across a local area
- Simpler distance calculation (by Pythagorean Theorem, rather than spherical trigonometry)
- A single unambiguous representation instead of the three (3) formats of latitude and longitude, each in widespread use, and each having punctuation sub-variants:
  - degrees-minutes-seconds (DMS): N 38°53'23.3", W 077°02'11.6"
  - degrees-minutes-decimal minutes (DMM or DDM): 38°53.388' N, 077°02.193' W
  - decimal degrees (DDD or DD): 38.88980°, -077.03654°

This format ambiguity has led to confusion with potentially serious consequences, particularly in emergency situations.

- References comprising only alphanumeric characters (letters and positive numbers). (Spaces have no significance but are allowed for readability.)
- No negative numbers, hemisphere indicators (+, -, N, S, E, W), decimal points (.), or special symbols (°, ′, ″, :).
- A familiar "read right then up" convention of XY Cartesian coordinates.
- An explicit convention for shortening references (at two levels) when the local or regional area is already unambiguously known.
- A reference to a definite grid square with variable, explicit precision (size), rather than to a point with (usually) unspecified precision implicit in number of decimal places.

All of the above also lead to USNG references being typically very succinct and compact, with flexibility to convey precise location information in a short sequence of characters that is easily relayed in writing or by voice.

== Limitations ==
As with any projection that seeks to represent the curved Earth as a flat surface, distortions and tradeoffs will inevitably occur. The USNG attempts to balance and minimize these, consistent with making the grid as useful as possible for its intended purpose of efficiently communicating practical locations. Since the UTM (the basis for USNG) is not a single projection, but rather a set of 6-degree longitudinal zones, there will necessarily be a local discontinuity along each of the 'seam' meridians between zones. However, every point continues to have a well-defined, unique geoaddress, and there are established conventions to minimize confusion near zone intersections. The six-degree zone width of UTM strikes a balance between the frequency of these discontinuities versus distortion of scale, which would increase unacceptably if the zones were made wider. (UTM further uses a 0.9996 scale factor at the central meridian, growing to 1.0000 at two meridians offset from the center, and increasing toward the zone boundaries, so as to minimize the overall effect of scale distortion across the zone breadth.) The USNG is not intended for surveying, for which a higher-precision (lower-distortion) coordinate system such as SPCS would be more appropriate. Also, since USNG north-south grid lines are (by design) a fixed distance from the zone central meridian, only the central meridian itself will be aligned with "true north". Other grid lines establish a local "grid north", which will differ from true north by a small amount. The amount of this deviation, which is indicated on USGS topographic maps, is typically much less than the magnetic declination (between true north and magnetic north), and is small enough that it can be disregarded in most land navigation situations.

== Adoption and current applications ==
=== Standards ===
Since its adoption as a national standard in 2001, the USNG has itself been incorporated into standards and operating procedures of other organizations:

- In 2011, the US Government's National Search and Rescue Committee (NSARC) released Version 1.0 of the Land Search and Rescue Addendum to the National Search and Rescue Supplement to the International Aeronautical and Maritime Search and Rescue Manual. This document specifies the US National Grid as the primary standard coordinate reference system to be used for all land-based search and rescue (SAR) activities in the US.
- In 2015, the Federal Emergency Management Agency (FEMA) issued FEMA Directive 092–5, "Use of the United States National Grid (USNG)":

"POLICY STATEMENT: FEMA will use the United States National Grid (USNG) as its standard geographic reference system for land-based operations and will encourage use of the USNG among whole community partners."

- A number of state and local Emergency Management agencies have also adopted the USNG for their operations.
- Other organizations including the National Fire Protection Association (NFPA) and the Society of Automotive Engineers (SAE) have incorporated the USNG into specific standards issued by those organizations.

=== Gridded maps ===
The utility of almost every large or medium scale map (paper or electronic) can be greatly enhanced by having an overlaid coordinate grid. The USNG provides such a grid that is universal, interoperable, non-proprietary, works across all jurisdictions, and can readily be used with GPS receivers and other location service applications.

In addition to providing a convenient means to identify and communicate specific locations (points and areas), an overlaid USNG grid also provides an orientation, and—because it is distance based—a scale of distance that is present across the map.

USGS topographic maps have for decades been published with 1000-meter UTM tick marks in the map collar, and sometimes with full grid lines across the map. Recent editions of these maps (those referenced to the North American datum of 1983, or NAD83) are compatible with USNG, and current editions also contain a standard USNG information box in the collar which identifies the GZD(s) (Grid Zone Designator(s) and the 100 km Grid Square ID(s) covering the area of the particular map. USNG can now be found on various pre-printed and custom-printed maps available for purchase, or generated from various mapping software packages.

=== Software applications ===
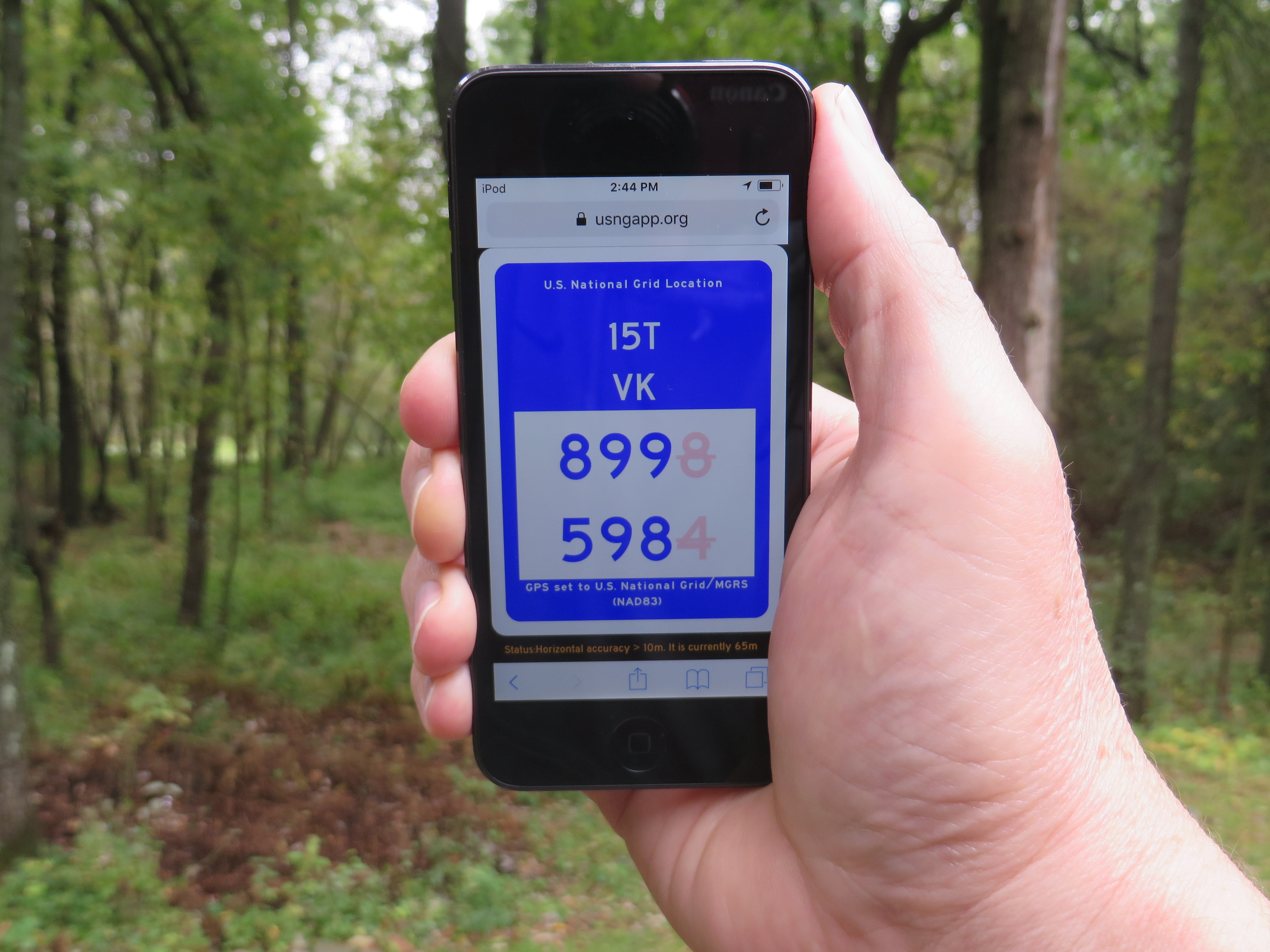
USNGapp.org is a free browser-based app which shows a mobile user's current USNG location. Once loaded, the app works without an Internet connection.

A growing number of software applications incorporate or refer to the US National Grid. See the External Links section below for links to some of these, including The National Map (USGS). These applications include conventional mapping applications with overlaid USNG grid and/or coordinate readouts, and several 'you-are-here' mobile applications which give the user's current USNG coordinates, such as USNGapp.org and FindMeSAR.com.

Mission Manager, the most widely used incident management software tool for first responders, integrates the USNG in its functionality.

=== Search and rescue (SAR) ===
As noted above under Standards, since 2011 the USNG has been designated by the US Government's National Search and Rescue Committee (NSARC) as the primary coordinate reference system to be used for all land-based search and rescue (SAR) activities in the US. (Latitude and longitude [DMM variant] may be used as the secondary system for land responders; especially when coordinating with air and sea based responders who may use it as their primary system, and USNG as secondary.)

The National Association for Search and Rescue (NASAR) is moving its education and certification testing programming towards USNG. Other organizations such as the National Alliance for Public Safety GIS (NAPSG) also provide USNG SAR training.

FEMA Urban Search and Rescue (USAR) task forces including Florida Task Force 4 (FL-TF4) and Iowa Task Force 1 (IA-TF1) have incorporated the USNG into their training and operations.

=== Emergency Location Marker (ELM) ===
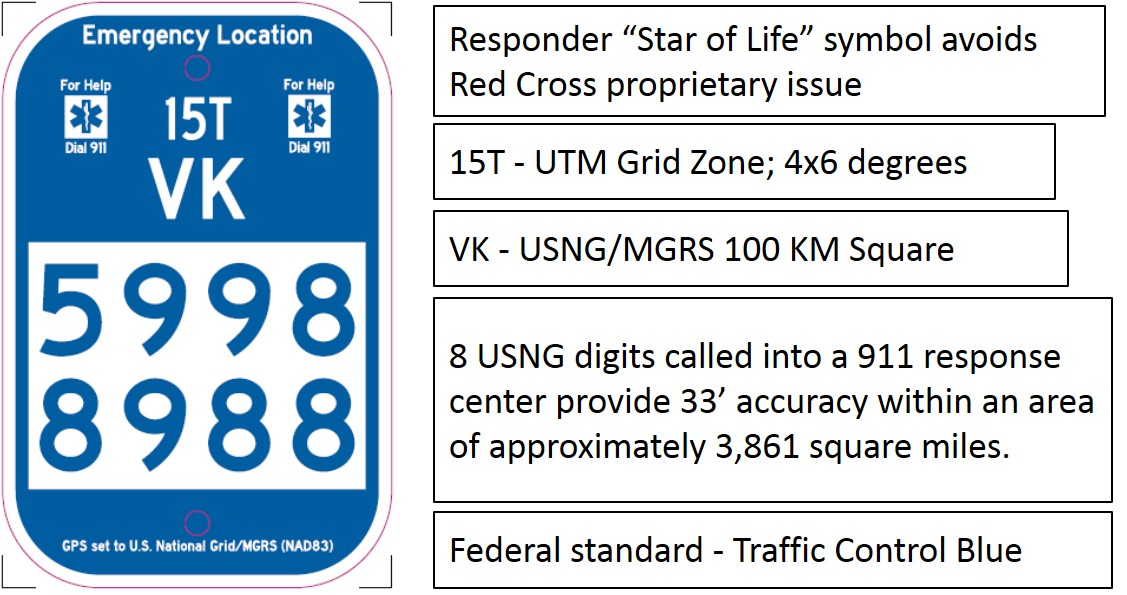
USNG Emergency Location Marker (ELM) Layout

Responders are often faced with significant geolocation issues when a responding to an emergency without a street address. This is particularly true in the recreational trail environment:

- 34% of U.S. response calls go to a location without a street address – recreational trails are a leading category.
- Trails with location signs typically employ an approach unique to that park or trail system, and
- Locally unique marking systems have no value to responders unless those locations are readily available via dispatch and response systems.

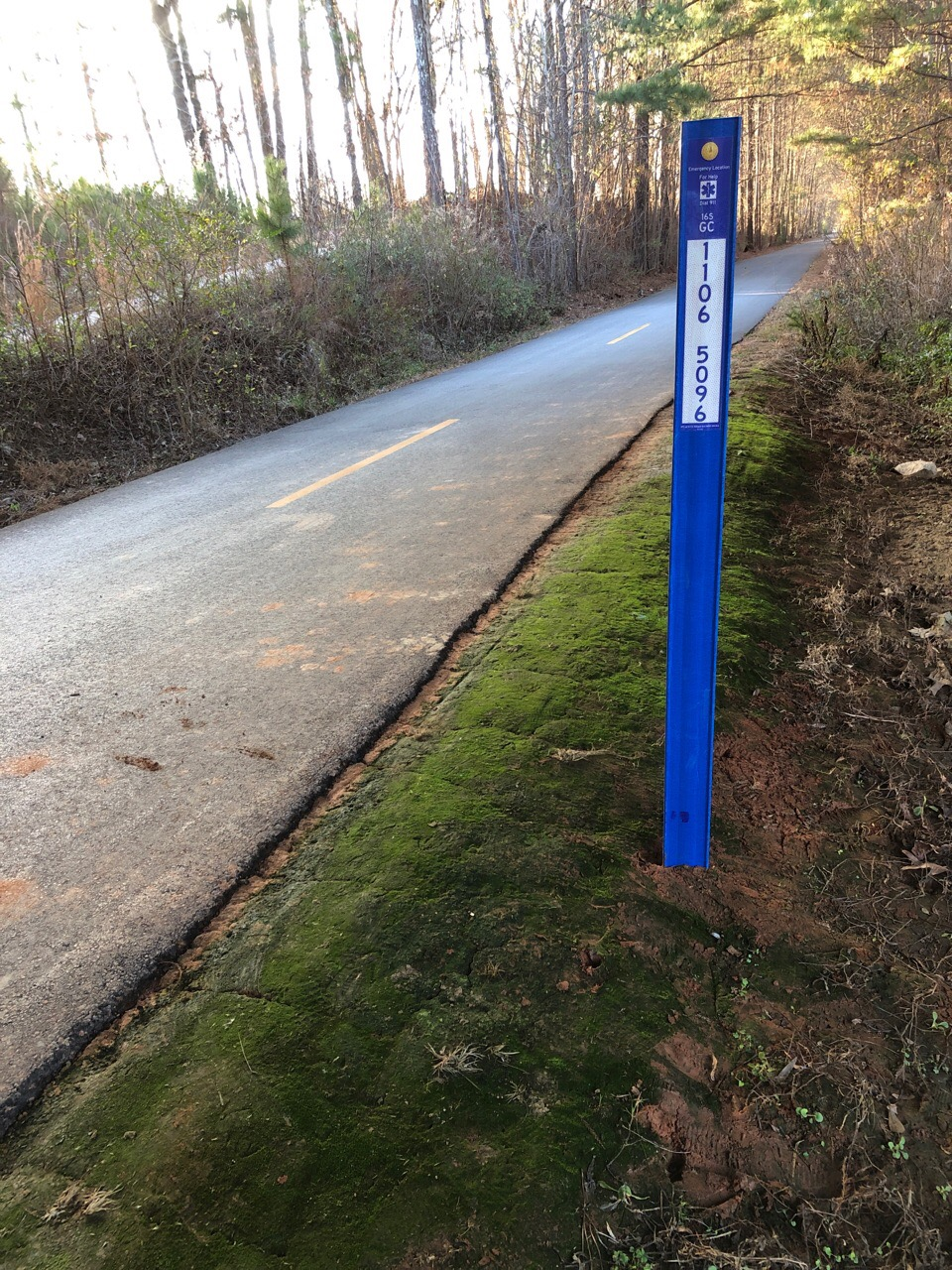
In addition to ELM's made from aluminum, in 2019 a vertical version was developed to support display in locations where break-away style posts were more appropriate. Version as shown is 60" out of ground and 3" wide.

In response to these issues, in 2009, a project funded by the nonprofit SharedGeo and University of Minnesota/Minnesota Department of Transportation Local Operational Research Assistance (OPERA) grant program got underway which had the following objectives:

- Develop a standardized Emergency Location Marker (ELM) which can be used anywhere in the nation in a variety of scenarios,
- Align the marking system with established federal and state cartographic and signage standards,
- Ensure the format leverages GPS instead of requiring constant updating of Computer Aided Dispatch (CAD) systems,
- Use a consistent approach which over time will become instantly recognizable by the public, and
- Involve multiple stakeholders during development to ensure a "Best Practices" outcome.

After three years of field research and vetting by multiple focus groups of trail users, responders, and geospatial experts, a design based on USNG was adopted.

This format, which can be used anywhere in the United States, was originally offered in three sizes to conform to federal, state and local signage standards:

- 6" x 9" (15 cm x 23 cm) -- for non-motorized trails
- 9" x 12" (23 cm x 30 cm) -- for motorized trails
- 12" x 12" (30 cm x 30 cm) -- for trail heads and huts

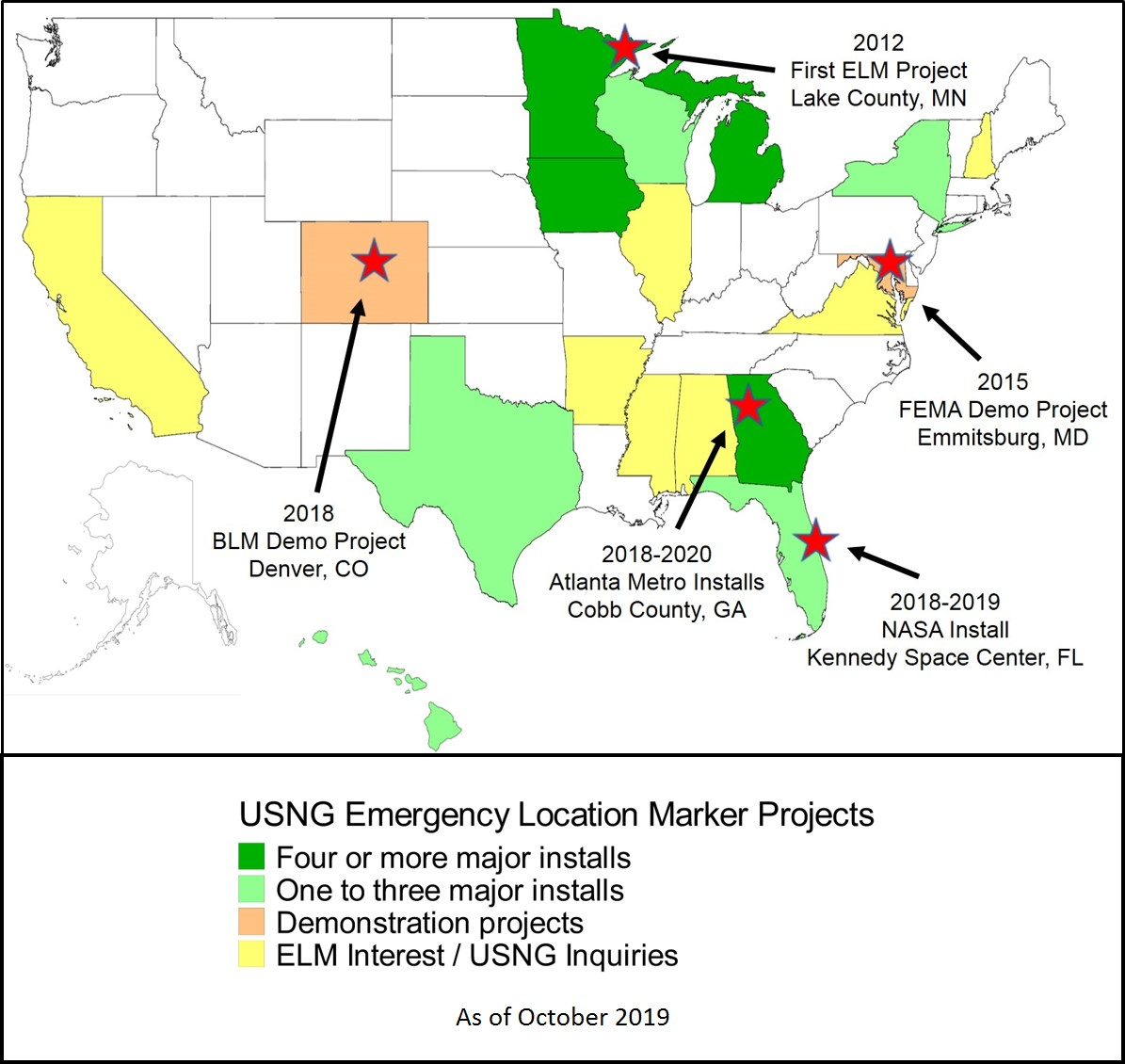
USNG ELM projects around the United States

In the years since introduction, the USNG ELM program now includes vertical ELM versions for breakaway scenarios (e.g. mountain bike trails), ELM information signs, ELM stickers to retrofit trail posts, and corresponding apps such as USNGapp.org.

USNG ELM implementations can be found in Minnesota, Florida, Georgia, Hawaii, Michigan, and other states.

=== First responders ===
The USNG can increase the effectiveness of all types of emergency response, ranging from missing persons searches to off-road medical responses. In Lake County MN, with 900 miles of recreational trails, dispatchers and first responders have been provided the tools and training to use USNG as their primary means of geo-location. The goal of this education for responders and the public is to "Take the 'Search' out of 'Search and Rescue.'"

In addition to ELM signs, notices at trailheads encourage hikers and off-road vehicle operators to "Download this USNG App" on their cell phones. Trail maps including USNG grid lines allow responders to interpolate locations from 911 callers who give their coordinates from ELMs or GPS apps. Cell phones also provide responders the opportunity to counsel lost or injured persons to determine their location by downloading USNG apps on the spot. This saves time and effort for responders and patients alike who are not on roads or addressed locations. When multiple teams of responders are working in close vicinity, such as during woods searches for lost individuals, communicating with USNG allows them to truncate their coordinate string to eight digits, giving their location within 10 meters without the use of decimals, special symbols or unit descriptors, and intuitively estimate the distance and direction between teams for better coordination.

=== Emergency management ===
Emergency managers coordinate response to and recovery from all types of natural hazards and man-made threats. In large scale events, where responders may be imported from many jurisdictions, coordination of geo-location formats is mandatory. The USNG is used to reduce confusion and improve efficiency in response to wildfires, floods and hurricanes and other events.

As noted above, In 2015, the Federal Emergency Management Agency (FEMA) issued FEMA Directive 092–5, "Use of the United States National Grid (USNG)":

"POLICY STATEMENT: FEMA will use the United States National Grid (USNG) as its standard geographic reference system for land-based operations and will encourage use of the USNG among whole community partners."

"Lessons learned from several large-scale disasters within the past three decades highlight the need for a common, geographic reference system in order to anticipate resource requirements, facilitate decision-making, and accurately deploy resources. ... Decision support tools that apply the USNG enable emergency managers to locate positions and identify areas of interest or operations where traditional references (i.e., landmarks or street signs) may be destroyed, damaged, or missing due to the effects of a disaster."

The USNG is also seen as a tool for enhancing situational awareness and facilitating a common operating picture in emergency scenarios.

The Department of Defense also has recognized the role of the civil USNG standard for the Armed Forces in support of homeland security and homeland defense.

=== Asset identification and mapping ===
Organizations such as public utilities, transportation departments, emergency responders, and others own or rely upon fixed, field-based assets which they need to track, inventory, maintain, and locate efficiently when needed. Examples include fire hydrants, overhead utility poles, storm drains, roadside signs, and many others.

Assigning unique identifiers is a common method for identifying and referencing particular assets. A strategically assigned asset identifier can include location information, thereby assuring both that the name is unique and that the location of the asset is always known. The USNG offers a method to locate any place or any object in the world with a brief alphanumeric code, which can be shortened depending on the known service area, and enhanced with a prefix code to identify the type of asset. Organizations have successfully fielded this type of USNG-based asset naming recently:

"The Mohawk Valley Water Authority serves 40,000 customers in the Greater Utica Area in Central New York. We have 700+ miles of pipe, 28 storage tanks, 21 pump stations, and numerous fire hydrants. We communicate hydrant status information internally and with many fire departments. We need to name these items meaningfully. We have tried several naming conventions—both sequential and hierarchical—with confusing and disappointing results. We converted to USNG asset naming and have used this successfully for over 4 years!" -- Elisabetta T. DeGeronimo, Watershed/GIS Coordinator at Mohawk Valley Water Authority, Utica, New York

--

"Hundreds of thousands of roadside assets—culverts, drains, signs on ground mounts, signs on overhead support structures, signs on span wires, and guide rails—are found along the routes maintained by the New York State Department of Transportation. In the past, the existence of these assets was only recorded in construction plans and the minds and memories of dedicated career staff. Our new asset naming convention, based upon the U.S. National Grid, benefits the entire department and particularly the field forces." -- Mary Susan Knauss, Senior Transportation Analyst, Office of Transportation Management, New York State Department of Transportation, Albany, New York

These and other contributors at Florida State University and elsewhere have collaborated to produce a manual to guide GIS users and others through the practical steps of naming assets using the USNG.

=== Recreation and other uses ===
There has been a concerted outreach to educate the public in the uses and advantages of USNG. Sharing USNG maps and apps with friends and families encourages them to keep each other informed of their locations when traveling off-road (i.e., in wilderness or on the water) for work or recreation. In addition, USNG can be used to mark and communicate locations in busy or remote urban areas, including where to meet friends in a wooded park, locating a car in a mall parking lot, or requesting help inside a large warehouse or business complex. One doesn't even need compass directions.

Scientific research fieldwork can also benefit.

== Future direction and initiatives ==
The USNG has seen steady but gradually increasing adoption and use since the standard was approved in 2001. Formal adoption by other standards bodies has taken place, while practical adoption in actual use has been more uneven in achieving its full potential. In 2018, the USNG Institute (UGNGI) was established "to study and report on USNG implementation efforts taking place across the United States" , as was a USNG Implementation Working Group (USNG IWG) to help assist and coordinate implementation efforts.

Further adoption of USNG for public safety and the Emergency Location Marker (ELM) system may depend in part on greater coordination of USNG adoption at Public Safety Answering Points (PSAPs, or 911 centers), in their procedures and Computer-Aided-Dispatch (CAD) systems. Currently such implementations, being generally under local control, have been more fragmented than some national adoption initiatives.

Proponents of the USNG envision many other ways in which it could play roles in improving safety, convenience, and quality of life.

== See also ==
- Cartesian coordinate system
- Grid reference
- Ordnance Survey National Grid (British National Grid)
- Irish national grid reference system
- Spatial Reference System
- List of National Coordinate Reference Systems
- Universal Transverse Mercator coordinate system (UTM)
- Military Grid Reference System (MGRS)
- Federal Geographic Data Committee (FGDC)
- Public Land Survey System (PLSS)
- State Plane Coordinate System (SPCS)
