= BNG =

BNG may refer to:

== Organisations ==
- Bandai Namco Games, a video game developer based in Tokyo, subsidiary of Namco Bandai Holdings
- Bank Nederlandse Gemeenten, Dutch bank
- British Nuclear Group, former subsidiary of British Nuclear Fuels Ltd
- Bahala Na Gang, a Filipino street gang with operations in the US and Philippines
- Bloque Nacionalista Galego (Galician Nationalist Bloc), a political party in Spain
- Bòrd na Gàidhlig, a government body in Scotland
- Business News Group, a publishing company in northern Mexico

== Cartography ==
- British National Grid, the Ordnance Survey National Grid reference system
- Bermuda National Grid, a kind of Transverse Mercator projection

== Places ==
- Banning Municipal Airport (IATA airport code)
- Bingen-White Salmon (Amtrak station) (Amtrak station code), Washington, US
- Binnaguri, a small cantonment town in West Bengal, India

== Other uses ==
- Barotse Native Government, a non-sovereign monarchy in Northern Rhodesia and Zambia
- Abbreviation used for biodiversity net gain in England
- Born of the Gods (Expansion code), a trading card game expansion set
- Bob and George, a webcomic
- Border network gateway or broadband network gateway, in computing
