= Business News =

Business News, a generic name, may refer to:

- Business News (Australia) (businessnews.com.au), an Australian business media organisation
- Business News (United States) (thebusinessnews.com), another media organization, which reported on Tarlton Theatre
- Business News Group, a Mexican publishing company
- Business News (Nigeria) (businessnews.com.ng), another media organization, which reported on Femi Hamzat and Tomilayo Adekanye
- now Business News Channel, a TV news channel

== See also ==
- Business journalism, journalism about business, economic and financial activities
- List of business newspapers
- BNN Bloomberg, formerly Business News Network
- bne IntelliNews, formerly Business New Europe
