= Projected coordinate system =

Cartesian geographic coordinate system

Layout of a UTM coordinate system.

A projected coordinate system – also called a projected coordinate reference system, planar coordinate system, or grid reference system – is a type of spatial reference system that represents locations on Earth using Cartesian coordinates (x, y) on a planar surface created by a particular map projection. Each projected coordinate system, such as "Universal Transverse Mercator WGS 84 Zone 26N," is defined by a choice of map projection (with specific parameters), a choice of geodetic datum to bind the coordinate system to real locations on the earth, an origin point, and a choice of unit of measure. Hundreds of projected coordinate systems have been specified for various purposes in various regions.

When the first standardized coordinate systems were created during the 20th century, such as the Universal Transverse Mercator, State Plane Coordinate System, and British National Grid, they were commonly called grid systems; the term is still common in some domains such as the military that encode coordinates as alphanumeric grid references. However, the term projected coordinate system has recently become predominant to clearly differentiate it from other types of spatial reference system. The term is used in international standards such as the EPSG and ISO 19111 (also published by the Open Geospatial Consortium as Abstract Specification 2), and in most geographic information system software.

== History ==
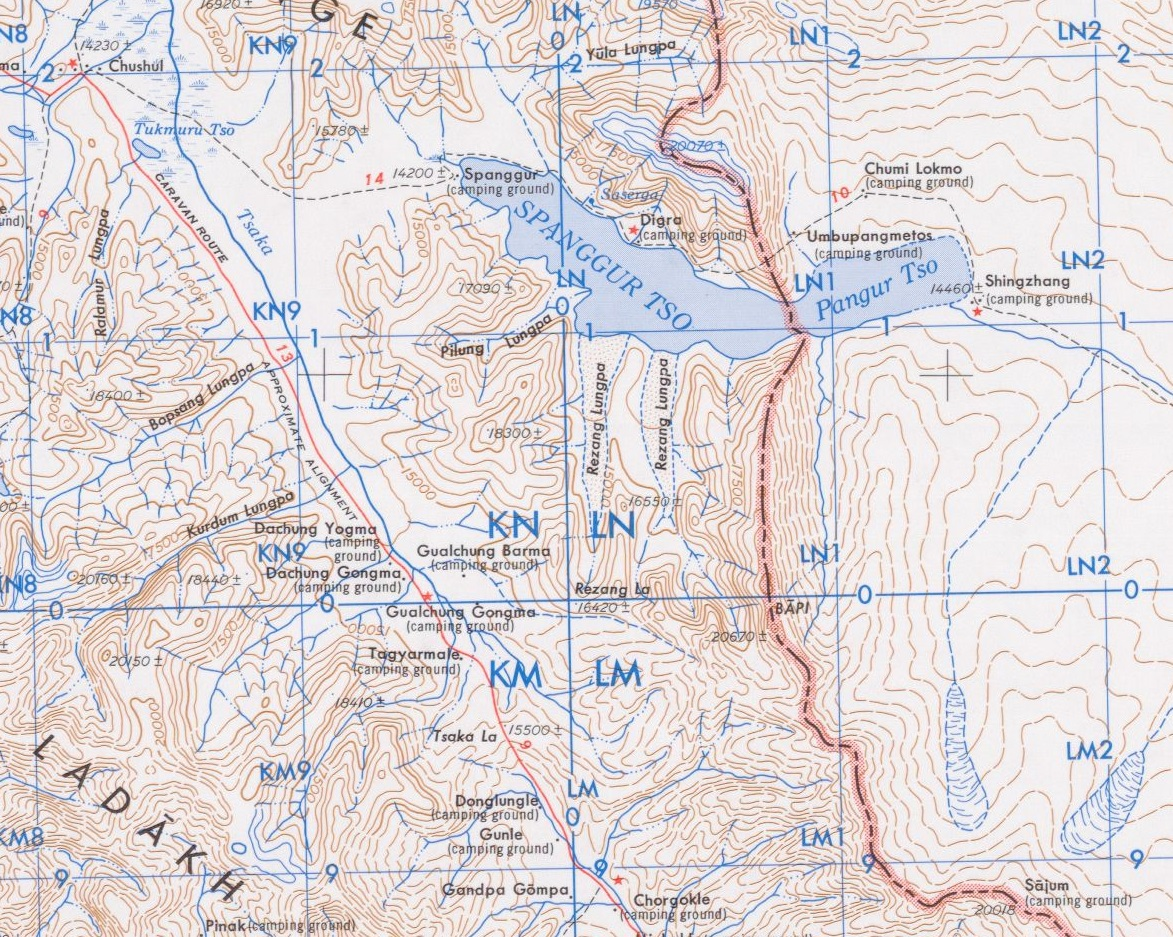
1954 AMS map of a portion of the disputed Aksai Chin region, showing the MGRS grid in blue.

The map projection and the geographic coordinate system (GCS, latitude and longitude) date to the Hellenistic period, proliferating during the Enlightenment Era of the 18th century. However, their use as the basis for specifying precise locations, rather than latitude and longitude, is a 20th century innovation.

Among the earliest was the State Plane Coordinate System (SPCS), which was developed in the United States during the 1930s for surveying and engineering, because calculations such as distance are much simpler in a Cartesian coordinate system than the three-dimensional trigonometry of GCS. In the United Kingdom, the first version of the British National Grid was released in 1938, based on earlier experiments during World War I by the Army and the Ordnance Survey.

During World War II, modern warfare practices required soldiers to quickly and accurately measure and report their location, leading to the printing of grids on maps by the U.S. Army Map Service (AMS) and other combatants. Initially, each theater of war was mapped in a custom projection with its own grid and coding system, but this resulted in confusion. This led to the development of the Universal Transverse Mercator coordinate system, possibly adopted from a system originally developed by the German Wehrmacht. To facilitate unambiguous reporting, the alphanumeric Military Grid Reference System (MGRS) was then created as an encoding scheme for UTM coordinates to make them easier to communicate.

After the War, UTM gradually gained users, especially in the scientific community. Because UTM zones do not align with political boundaries, several countries followed the United Kingdom in creating their own national or regional grid systems based on custom projections. The use and invention of such systems especially proliferated during the 1980s with the emergence of geographic information systems. GIS requires locations to be specified as precise coordinates and performs numerous calculations on them, making Cartesian geometry preferable to spherical trigonometry when computing power was at a premium. In recent years, the rise of global GIS datasets and satellite navigation, along with an abundance of processing speed in personal computers, have led to a resurgence in the use of GCS. That said, projected coordinate systems are still very common in the GIS data stored in the spatial data infrastructures (SDI) of local areas, such as cities, counties, states and provinces, and small countries.

== System specification ==
Because the purpose of any coordinate system is to accurately and unambiguously measure, communicate, and perform calculations on locations, it must be defined precisely. The EPSG Geodetic Parameter Dataset is the most common mechanism for publishing such definitions in a machine-readable form, and forms the basis for many GIS and other location-aware software programs. A projected SRS specification consists of three parts:

- An abstract two-dimensional Cartesian coordinate system that allows for the measurement of each location as a tuple (x, y), which are also called the easting and northing in many systems such as UTM. Any coordinate system definition must include a planar surface, an origin point, a set of orthogonal axes to define the direction of each measurement, and a unit of measure (usually the meter or US foot).
- A choice of map projection that creates a planar surface for the coordinate system that is connected to locations on the Earth. In addition to the general type of projection (e.g., Lambert conformal conic, transverse Mercator), a coordinate system definition will specify the parameters to be used, such as a center point, standard parallels, scale factor, false origin, and such. With these parameters, the underlying formulas of the projection convert latitude and longitude directly into the (x, y) coordinates of the system.
- A choice of geodetic datum, which includes a choice of earth ellipsoid. This binds the coordinate system to actual locations on the Earth by controlling the measurement framework for latitude and longitude (GCS). Thus, there will be a significant difference between the coordinate of a location in "UTM NAD83 Zone 14N" and for the same location in "UTM NAD27 Zone 14N", even though the UTM formulas are identical, because the underlying latitude and longitude values are different. In some GIS software, this part of the definition is called the choice of a particular geographic coordinate system.

=== Projections ===
To establish the position of a geographic location on a map, a map projection is used to convert geodetic coordinates to plane coordinates on a map; it projects the datum ellipsoidal coordinates and height onto a flat surface of a map. The datum, along with a map projection applied to a grid of reference locations, establishes a grid system for plotting locations. Conformal projections are generally preferred. Common map projections include the transverse Mercator (used in Universal Transverse Mercator, the British National Grid, the State Plane Coordinate System for some states), Lambert conformal conic (some states in the SPCS), and Mercator (Swiss coordinate system).

Map projection formulas depend on the geometry of the projection as well as parameters dependent on the particular location at which the map is projected. The set of parameters can vary based on the type of project and the conventions chosen for the projection. For the transverse Mercator projection used in UTM, the parameters associated are the latitude and longitude of the natural origin, the false northing and false easting, and an overall scale factor. Given the parameters associated with particular location or grin, the projection formulas for the transverse Mercator are a complex mix of algebraic and trigonometric functions.

=== Easting and northing ===
Every map projection has a natural origin, e.g., at which the ellipsoid and flat map surfaces coincide, at which point the projection formulas generate a coordinate of (0,0). To ensure that the northing and easting coordinates on a map are not negative (thus making measurement, communication, and computation easier), map projections may set up a false origin, specified in terms of false northing and false easting values, that offset the true origin. For example, in UTM, the origin of each northern zone is a point on the equator 500 km west of the central meridian of the zone (the edge of the zone itself is just under 400 km to the west). This has the desirable effect of making all coordinates within the zone positive values, being east and north of the origin. Because of this, they are often referred to as the easting and northing.

=== Grid north ===
Grid north (GN) is a navigational term referring to the direction northwards along the grid lines of a map projection. It is contrasted with true north (the direction of the North Pole) and magnetic north (the direction in which a compass needle points). Many topographic maps, including those of the United States Geological Survey and Great Britain's Ordnance Survey, indicate the difference between grid north, true north, and magnetic north.

The grid lines on Ordnance Survey maps divide the UK into one-kilometre squares, east of an imaginary zero point in the Atlantic Ocean, west of Cornwall. The grid lines point to a Grid North, varying slightly from True North. This variation is zero on the central meridian (north-south line) of the map, which is at two degrees west of the Prime Meridian, and greatest at the map edges. The difference between grid north and true north is very small and can be ignored for most navigation purposes. The difference exists because the correspondence between a flat map and the round Earth is necessarily imperfect.

At the South Pole, grid north conventionally points northwards along the Prime Meridian. Since the meridians converge at the poles, true east and west directions change rapidly in a condition similar to gimbal lock. Grid north solves this problem.

== Grid reference encodings ==
Locations in a projected coordinate system, like any cartesian coordinate system, are measured and reported as easting/northing or (x, y) pairs. The pair is usually represented conventionally with easting first, northing second. For example, the peak of Mount Assiniboine (at 50°52′10″N 115°39′03″W on the British Columbia/Alberta border in Canada) in UTM Zone 11 is at (0594934mE, 5636174mN), meaning that is almost 600km east of the false origin for Zone 11 (95km east of the true central meridian at 117°W) and 5.6 million meters north of the equator.

While such precise numbers are easy to store and calculate in GIS and other computer databases, they can be difficult for humans to remember and communicate. Thus, since the mid 20th century, there have been alternative encodings that shorten the numbers or convert the numbers into some form of alphanumeric string.

For example, a truncated grid reference may be used where the general location is already known to participants and may be assumed. Because the (leading) most significant digits specify the part of the world and the (trailing) least significant digits provide a precision that is not needed in most circumstances, they may be unnecessary for some uses. This permits users to shorten the example coordinates to 949-361 by concealing 05nnn34 56nnn74, assuming the significant digits (3,4, and 5 in this case) are known to both parties.

Alphanumeric encodings typically use codes to replace the most significant digits by partitioning the world up into large grid squares. For example, in the Military Grid Reference System, the above coordinate is in grid 11U (representing UTM Zone 11 5xxxxxx mN), and grid cell NS within that (representing the second digit 5xxxxxmE x6xxxxxm N), and as many remaining digits as are needed are reported, yielding an MGRS grid reference of 11U NS 949 361 (or 11U NS 9493 3617 or 11U NS 94934 36174).

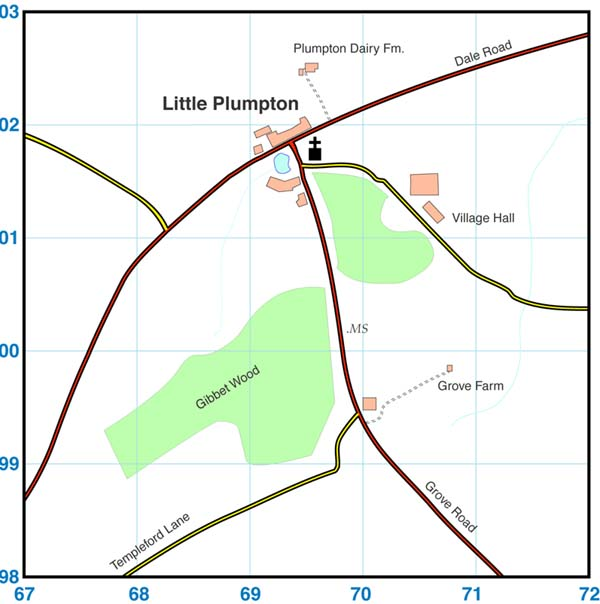
A typical map with grid lines

The Ordnance Survey National Grid (United Kingdom) and other national grid systems use similar approaches. In Ordnance Survey maps, each Easting and Northing grid line is given a two-digit code, based on the British national grid reference system with an origin point just off the southwest coast of the United Kingdom. The area is divided into 100 km squares, each of which is denoted by a two-letter code. Within each 100 km square, a numerical grid reference is used. Since the Eastings and Northings are one kilometre apart, a combination of a Northing and an Easting will give a four-digit grid reference describing a one-kilometre square on the ground. The convention is the grid reference numbers call out the lower-left corner of the desired square. In the example map above, the town Little Plumpton lies in the square 6901, even though the writing which labels the town is in 6802 and 6902, most of the buildings (the orange boxed symbols) are in square 6901.

=== Precision ===
The more digits added to a grid reference, the more precise the reference becomes. To locate a specific building in Little Plumpton, a further two digits are added to the four-digit reference to create a six-digit reference. The extra two digits describe a position within the 1-kilometre square. Imagine (or draw or superimpose a Romer) a further 10x10 grid within the current grid square. Any of the 100 squares in the superimposed 10×10 grid can be accurately described using a digit from 0 to 9 (with 0 being the bottom left square and 9 being the top right square).

For the church in Little Plumpton, this gives the digits 6 and 7 (6 on the left to right axis (Eastings) and 7 on the bottom to top axis (Northings). These are added to the four-figure grid reference after the two digits describing the same coordinate axis, and thus our six-figure grid reference for the church becomes 696017. This reference describes a 100-metre by 100-metre square, and not a single point, but this precision is usually sufficient for navigation purposes. The symbols on the map are not precise in any case, for example the church in the example above would be approximately 100x200 metres if the symbol was to scale, so in fact, the middle of the black square represents the map position of the real church, independently of the actual size of the church.

Grid references comprising larger numbers for greater precision could be determined using large-scale maps and an accurate Romer. This might be used in surveying but is not generally used for land navigating for walkers or cyclists, etc. The growing availability and decreasing cost of handheld GPS receivers enables determination of accurate grid references without needing a map, but it is important to know how many digits the GPS displays to avoid reading off just the first six digits. A GPS unit commonly gives a ten-digit grid reference, based on two groups of five numbers for the Easting and Northing values. Each successive increase in precision (from 6 digit to 8 digit to 10 digit) pinpoints the location more precisely by a factor of 10. Since, in the UK at least, a 6-figure grid reference identifies a square of 100-metre sides, an 8-figure reference would identify a 10-metre square, and a 10-digit reference a 1-metre square. In order to give a standard 6-figure grid reference from a 10-figure GPS readout, the 4th, 5th, 9th and 10th digits must be omitted, so it is important not to read just the first 6 digits.

== Examples of projected CRS ==
UTM zones on an equirectangular world map with irregular zones in red

- Universal Transverse Mercator (UTM): not a single coordinate system, but a series of 60 zones (each being a gore 6° wide), each a system with its own Transverse Mercator projection.
- Universal Polar Stereographic (UPS): a pair of coordinate systems covering the Arctic and Antarctica using a Stereographic projection.
- Ordnance Survey National Grid (OSNG): a transverse mercator projection centered on 2°W that covers Great Britain with its own encoding scheme.
- State Plane Coordinate System (SPCS): another composite system of more than 120 coordinate systems (zones), each covering a state of the United States or a portion thereof.
- Swiss coordinate system (LV95): covers Switzerland, using a Mercator projection.
- Irish Transverse Mercator (ITM): jointly created by the Republic of Ireland and United Kingdom to cover the island of Ireland.
- Bermuda National Grid
- Hellenic Geodetic Reference System 1987 (Greece)
- Israeli Transverse Mercator (NIG)
- Swedish grid (RT90)

== See also ==
- Discrete global grid (DGG)
- East north up
- Geocodes
- Geodetic datum
- Geographical distance
- Graticule (cartography)
- Horizontal plane
- Lattice graph (grid as mathematical abstraction)
- Map projection
- Spatial reference system
- Spatial grid
