= Modified transverse Mercator =

The modified transverse Mercator (MTM) coordinate system is a metric grid-based method of specifying geographic locations, similar to the Universal Transverse Mercator coordinate system (UTM). However, MTM uses a transverse Mercator projection with zones spaced 3° of longitude apart, one half of the spacing of UTM zones, to further reduce distortion.

== Properties ==
Like any Mercator projection, MTM is a conformal map projection, so angles at any point, and the shape of small areas, are true. However, scale varies slightly by longitude.

Due to its narrower zones, the scale factor for MTM varies less than for UTM. This allows the MTM scale factor to be set to 0.9999 (distortion of 1:10,000) in the midpoint of a zone, versus 0.9996 (1:2,500) for UTM.

Like UTM, the direction of true north is not perfect grid north away from each zone's central meridian, i.e. non-central meridians are slightly curved. The deviation between grid and true north is called the angle of convergence, and is roughly proportional to the east-west (longitudinal) distance away from the central meridian, and the sine of the latitude. This deviation can be on the order of 1° in temperate latitudes and so needs to be taken into account.

== Usage ==
The MTM coordinate system is used by various government institutions in Canada in particular, especially from Ontario through to the Maritimes. Canada is covered by 32 zones, generally following the canonical 3° longitude spacing, with an adjustment in the urban area around Toronto and slight zone expansion at the east and west edges of Nova Scotia.

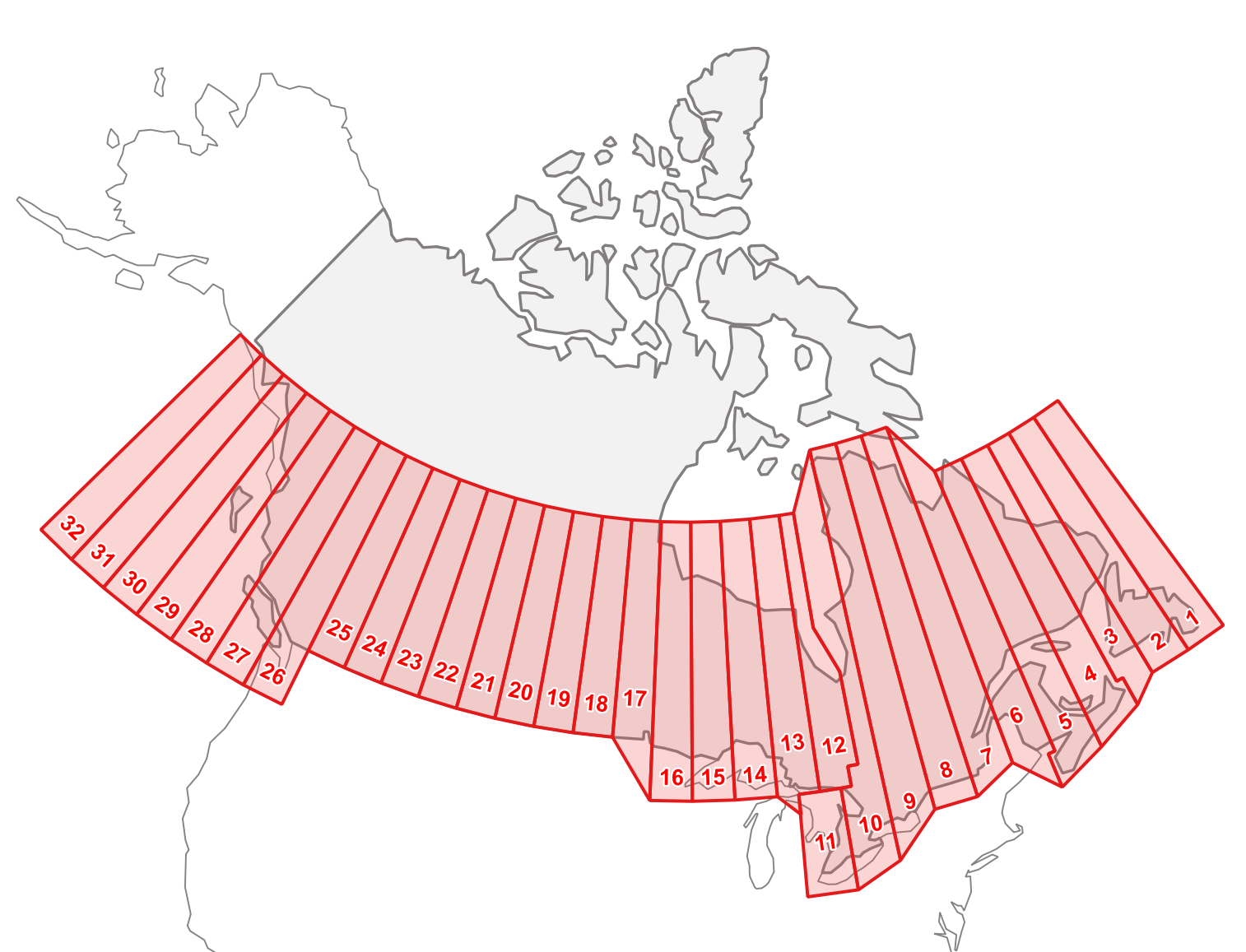
MTM zones (in their typical usage area) overlaid over map of Canada

The province of Alberta refers to MTM as 3TM (3 degree transverse Mercator) and uses 4 zones to cover the province.

MTM is more suitable than UTM for parametrizing and displaying cadastral surveys, since grid distances (calculated from MTM coordinates) differ less from ground measurements.

Just like UTM, MTM eastings (X coordinates) do not align across zone boundaries, so a given map needs to be displayed wholly in one MTM zone. However, the distortion from using a given MTM zone's projection slightly outside its intended 3°-wide area is minimal, so slight mapping excursions outside the zone area are tolerated. Nevertheless, for large-scale maps, such as of a whole Province or all of Canada, or for far north areas, MTM is not suitable and different map projections need to be used.

MTM is conceptually similar to the Gauss-Kruger coordinate system historically used in parts of continental Europe, even though the parameters (and scale factor) are different.

== Mathematical formulae ==
Coming from the same family of projections, conversion between latitude and longitude and MTM coordinates uses the same mathematical formulae as those for UTM. However, the parameters (in the same notation) are adapted as below for the different zone configuration.

- The central meridians $\lambda_{0}$ reflect the 3° spacing.
- The central meridian scale factor $k_0=0.9999$.
- The false easting $E_0=304800$m by convention, rather than $E_0=500000$m for UTM. Note, however, that Alberta uses 0 for 3TM.
- The false northing $N_0$ remains 0 as for UTM. However, a given geographical point's northing (Y coordinate) is in general slightly different in UTM and MTM since $\lambda_{0}$ and $k_{0}$ are not the same.

== Use in cadastral surveying ==
Both MTM and UTM are in use in present-day Canadian cadastral surveying. In particular, coordinates in either system are acceptable for specifying observed reference points (ORPs) in Ontario, and "grid bearings" in MTM or UTM are increasingly used rather than astronomic bearings.

The use of MTM in a land surveying context faces the same challenges as UTM regarding conversion of ground to grid distances, and grid convergence angle. The same approximations as are used for UTM are applicable, with the appropriate substitution for MTM $k_0$ and central meridians. Due to the narrower zones and scale factor significantly closer to 1, fewer curvature corrections are required for MTM grid calculations to match ground measurements within a typical land surveying empirical error (e.g., target maximum misclosure distance of 1:5000). However, they are still needed for long east-west traverses or integrations, depending on precision requirements.

Importantly, MTM (and UTM) coordinates depend meaningfully on the horizontal datum being used, so it is necessary to clarify whether the datum is NAD 27 (now rare), NAD 83, or NAD 83 (CSRS) (both common). Technically, the choice of datum affects geodetic coordinates, not their projection in MTM (or UTM). However, appropriate conversion between those datums plays a material role in projected coordinate conversion. Over a small area being represented, relative easting and northing coordinate differences (i.e., relevant for comparisons between nearby points) between MTM and UTM, or between MTM/UTM realizations for different datums, differ only by a scaling given by the ratio of the (local) scale factors $k$, and by a rotation capturing the difference of the respective angles of convergence.

In particular, differences in grid bearing and grid distance measured on two small-scale UTM and/or MTM maps are wholly determined by the longitude deviation from their respective central meridians at the point of measurement. The grid distance deviation is the greatest at the UTM central meridians (up to 650 ppm at the equator), though this is invisible to end users when indicated distances are converted from grid to ground.
