= Romer (tool) =

Cartographic measuring tool

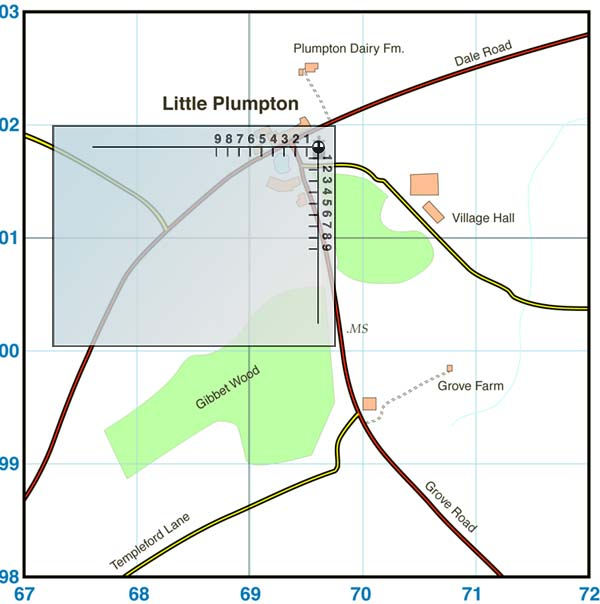
This illustration shows how the Romer is used. Here, we are plotting the reference 696018. The marks corresponding to (6, 8) on the Romer are lined up along the gridlines (69, 01). The hole near the corner yields the exact point, the church at Little Plumpton.

A reference card or Romer is a device for increasing the accuracy when reading a grid reference from a map.

== Design and use ==
Made from transparent plastic, paper or other materials, reference cards are found on most baseplate compasses. Essentially, they are a specially marked-out ruler which matches the scale of the map in use. The scales are laid out in reverse, such that by lining up the numbers given in the grid reference with the gridlines for the square in question, the corner of the Romer lies on the location the grid reference of which is being read. Some transparent versions have a small hole at the origin when this is not at the corner of the reference card. This allows access to the map such that the location can be marked with a pencil if using the reference card in reverse having been given a grid reference to start with. They are used in many types of land navigation and map reading, to give a more accurate grid reference than one just estimated by eye from the grid lines on the map.

While Romers of various designs are available commercially, they can easily be made by hand, by using a computer, or by finding a website with instructions.

== History ==
Invented in 1915 by Temporary Lieutenant (later Captain) Carrol Romer, M.C., R.E. (1883–1951), then "Maps", First Army: i.e. OC Maps and Printing Section, such reference cards were widely used by the British Army in World War I and after, being described in a Maps GHQ booklet Maps and Artillery Boards in December 1916. The name 'Romer' seems only to have been used officially from 1929.

A version was later developed for car navigational rallies by car rally partners Eric Gardner and John Cridford during the early 1950s, the 'Garford Romer' was available for both imperial and metric Ordnance Survey maps and is still sold today. Although a registered design when it was first made and sold it was and still is much copied.

== See also ==
- Flight computer
- Protractor
