= Military Grid Reference System =

NATO global coordinate reference system

MGRS grid zones on an equirectangular world map, with irregular grid zones in red and New York City's grid zone highlighted

The Military Grid Reference System (MGRS) is the geocoordinate standard used by NATO militaries for geo-referencing, position reporting, and situational awareness during land operations. An MGRS coordinate does not represent a single point, but rather identifies a square area (which can be as small as 1 m x 1 m) on the Earth's surface. The MGRS is derived from the Universal Transverse Mercator (UTM) and Universal Polar Stereographic (UPS) grid systems and is used as a geocode system for the entire Earth.

An example of an MGRS coordinate, or grid reference, is 4Q FJ 1234 6789, which consists of three parts:

- 4Q (grid zone designator, GZD)
- FJ (the 100,000-meter square identifier)
- 1234 6789 (numerical location; easting is 1234 and northing is 6789, in this case specifying a location with 10 m resolution)

For machine-readability and database storage, all spaces may be removed.

An MGRS coordinate references a square or polygon on the Earth with a side length of 10 km, 1 km, 100 m, 10 m or 1 m, depending on the precision of the coordinates provided. (Certain squares adjacent to a Grid Zone Junction (GZJ) are clipped at an angle, resulting in a polygonal shape.)

MGRS precision levels
MGRS Coordinate	Precision (side length)
4Q FJ	100,000-meter square
4Q FJ 1 6	10,000-meter square
4Q FJ 12 67	1,000-meter square
4Q FJ 123 678	100-meter square
4Q FJ 1234 6789	10-meter square
4Q FJ 12345 67890	1-meter square

The number of digits in the numerical location must be even: 0, 2, 4, 6, 8 or 10, depending on the desired precision. When changing precision levels, it is important to truncate rather than round the easting and northing values to ensure the more precise square will remain within the boundaries of the less precise square.

Related to this is the primacy of the southwest corner of the square being the labeling point for the entire square. (In instances where the polygon is not a square and has been clipped by a grid zone junction, the polygon keeps the label of the southwest corner as if it had not been clipped.)

Google Maps recognizes MGRS grid references with one-meter square (10-digit numerical location) with spaces permitted only between the grid zone, the easting, and the northing (e.g., 4QFJ 12345 67890), and returns a dropped pin representing the centroid of the area referenced.

== Grid zone designation ==
The first part of an MGRS coordinate is the grid-zone designation. The 6° wide UTM zones, numbered 1–60, are intersected by latitude bands that are normally 8° high, lettered C–X (omitting I and O). The northmost latitude band, X, is 12° high. The intersection of a UTM zone and a latitude band is (normally) a 6° × 8° polygon called a grid zone, whose designation in MGRS is formed by the zone number (one or two digits – the number for zones 1 to 9 is just a single digit, according to the example in DMA TM 8358.1, Section 3-2, Figure 7), followed by the latitude band letter (uppercase). This same notation is used in both UTM and MGRS, i.e. the UTM grid reference system; the article on Universal Transverse Mercator shows many maps of these grid zones, including the irregularities for Svalbard and southwest Norway.

As Figure 1 illustrates, Honolulu is in grid zone 4Q.

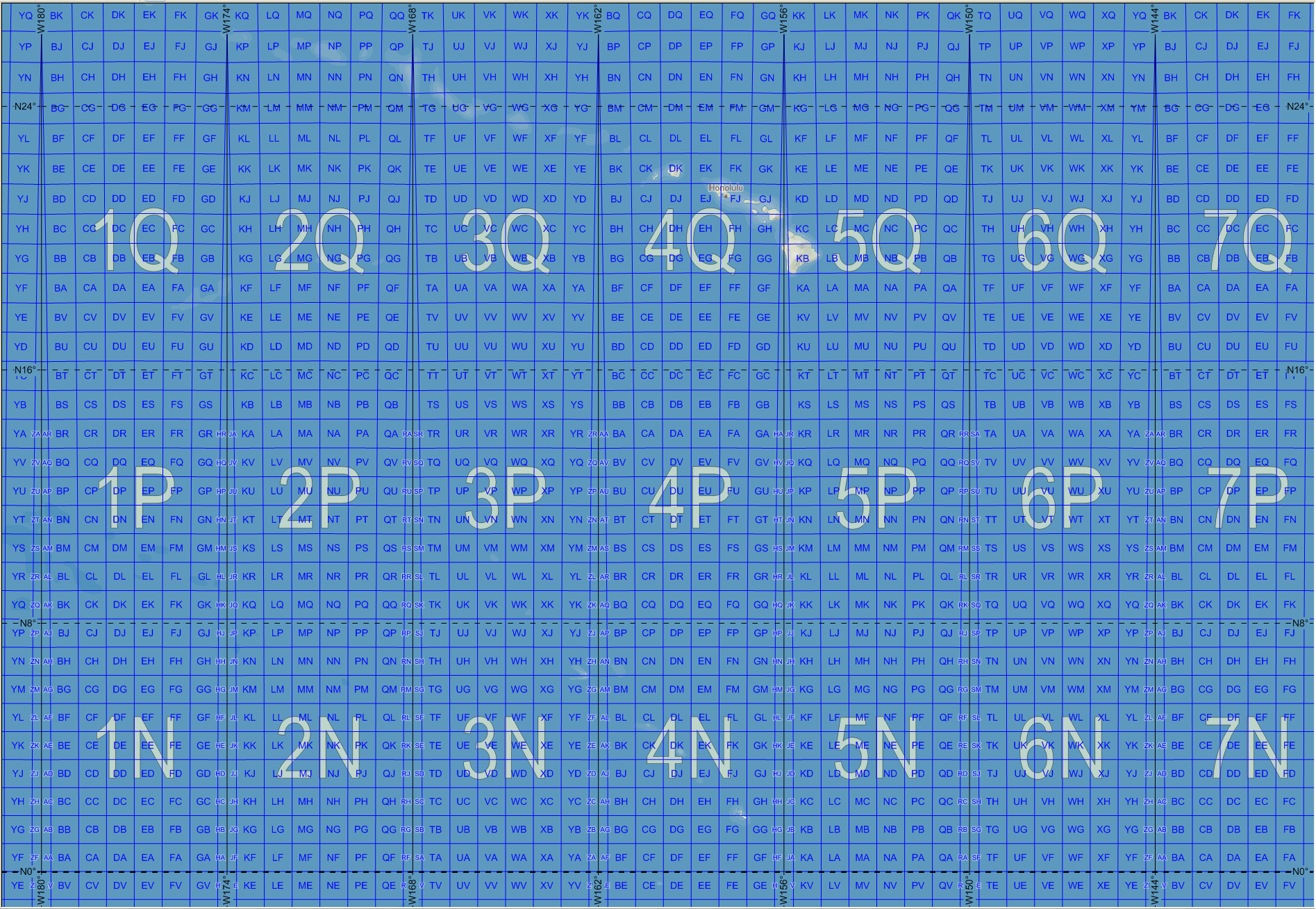
Figure 1. The origin of the MGRS grid, in the Pacific. Honolulu is in 4QFJ.

== 100,000-meter square identification ==
The second part of an MGRS coordinate is the 100,000-meter square identification. Each UTM zone is divided into 100,000 meter squares, so that their corners have UTM-coordinates that are multiples of 100,000 meters. The identification consists of a column letter (A–Z, omitting I and O) followed by a row letter (A–V, omitting I and O).

Near the equator, the columns of UTM zone 1 have the letters A–H, the columns of UTM zone 2 have the letters J–R (omitting O), and the columns of UTM zone 3 have the letters S–Z. At zone 4, the column letters start over from A, and so on around the world.

For the row letters, there are actually two alternative lettering schemes within MGRS:

- In the AA scheme, also known as MGRS-New, which is used for WGS84 and some other modern geodetic datums, the letter for the first row – just north of the equator – is A in odd-numbered zones, and F in even-numbered zones, as shown in figure 1. Note that the westmost square in this row, in zone 1, has identification AA.
- In the alternative AL scheme, also known as MGRS-Old, which is used for some older geodetic datums, the row letters are shifted 10 steps in the alphabet. This means that the letter for the first row is L in odd-numbered zones and R in even-numbered zones. The westmost square in the first row, in zone 1, has identification AL.

If an MGRS coordinate is complete (with both a grid zone designation and a 100,000 meter square identification), and is valid in one lettering scheme, then it is usually invalid in the other scheme, which will have no such 100,000 meter square in the grid zone. (Latitude band X is the exception to this rule.) Therefore, a position reported in a modern datum usually cannot be misunderstood as using an old datum, and vice versa – provided the datums use different MGRS lettering schemes.

In the map (figure 1), which uses the AA scheme, we see that Honolulu is in grid zone 4Q, and square FJ. To give the position of Honolulu with 100 km resolution, we write 4QFJ.

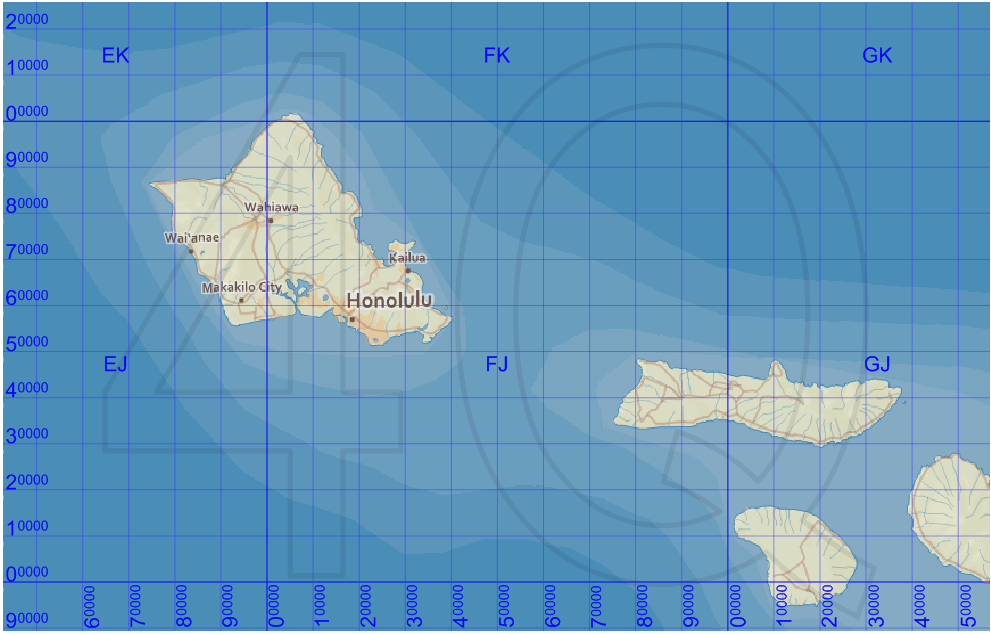
Figure 2. The MGRS grid around Hawaii. Honolulu is in the 10 km square that is called 4QFJ15.

== Numerical location ==
The third part of an MGRS coordinate is the numerical location within a 100,000 meter square, given as n + n digits, where n is 1, 2, 3, 4, or 5. If 5 + 5 digits is used, the first 5 digits give the easting in meters, measured from the left edge of the square, and the last 5 digits give the northing in meters, measured from the bottom edge of the square. The resolution in this case is 1 meter, so the MGRS coordinate would represent a 1-meter square, where the easting and northing are measured to its southwest corner. If a resolution of 10 meters is enough, the final digit of the easting and northing can be dropped, so that only 4 + 4 digits are used, representing a 10-meter square. If a 100-meter resolution is enough, 3 + 3 digits suffice; if a 1 km resolution is enough, 2 + 2 digits suffice; if 10 km resolution is enough, 1 + 1 digits suffice. 10 meter resolution (4 + 4 digits) is sufficient for many purposes, and is the NATO standard for specifying coordinates.

If we zoom in on Hawaii (figure 2), we see that the square that contains Honolulu, if we use 10 km resolution, would be written 4QFJ15.

If the grid zone or 100,000-meter square are clear from context, they can be dropped, and only the numerical location is specified. For example:

- If every position being located is within the same grid zone, only the 100,000-meter square and numerical location are specified.
- If every position being located is within the same grid zone and 100,000-meter square, only the numerical location is specified.
- However, even if every position being located is within a small area, but the area overlaps multiple 100,000-meter squares or grid zones, the entire grid reference is required.

One always reads map coordinates from west to east first (easting), then from south to north (northing). Common mnemonics include "in the house, up the stairs", "left-to-right, bottom-to-top" and "Read Right Up".

=== Truncation, not rounding ===
As mentioned above, when converting UTM coordinates to an MGRS grid reference, or when abbreviating an MGRS grid reference to lower precision, coordinates are truncated, and not rounded up (which would indicate the next adjacent grid square instead of the surrounding square).

This was once controversial as the oldest specification, TM8358.1, indicated rounding, and early versions of GEOTRANS followed suit. However, truncation has been applied in GEOTRANS since version 3.0, as well as in NGA Military Map Reading 201 (page 5) and in the U.S. Army Field Manual 3–25.26.

Likewise, the civilian/continental version of MGRS, USNG, specifies truncation.

== Squares that cross a latitude band boundary ==
The boundaries of the latitude bands are parallel circles (dashed black lines in figure 1), which do not coincide with the boundaries of the 100,000-meter squares (blue lines in figure 1). For example, at the boundary between grid zones 1P and 1Q, we find a 100,000-meter square BT, of which about two thirds is south of latitude 16° and therefore in grid zone 1P, while one third is north of 16° and therefore in 1Q. So, an MGRS grid reference for a position in BT should begin with 1PBT in the south part of BT, and with 1QBT in the north part of BT. At least, this is possible if the precision of the grid reference is enough to place the denoted area completely inside either 1P or 1Q.

But an MGRS grid reference can denote an area that crosses a latitude band boundary. For example, when describing the entire square BT, should it be called 1PBT or 1QBT? Or when describing the 1000-meter square BT8569, should it be called 1PBT8569 or 1QBT8569? In these cases, software that interprets an MGRS grid reference should accept both of the possible latitude band letters. A practical motivation was given in the release notes for GEOTRANS, Release 2.0.2, 1999:

The MGRS module was changed to make the final latitude check on MGRS to UTM conversions sensitive to the precision of the input MGRS coordinate string. The lower the input precision, the more "slop" is allowed in the final check on the latitude zone letter. This is to handle an issue raised by some F-16 pilots, who truncate MGRS strings that they receive from the Army. This truncation can put them on the wrong side of a latitude zone boundary, causing the truncated MGRS string to be considered invalid. The correction causes truncated strings to be considered valid if any part of the square which they denote lies within the latitude zone specified by the third letter of the string.

== Polar regions ==
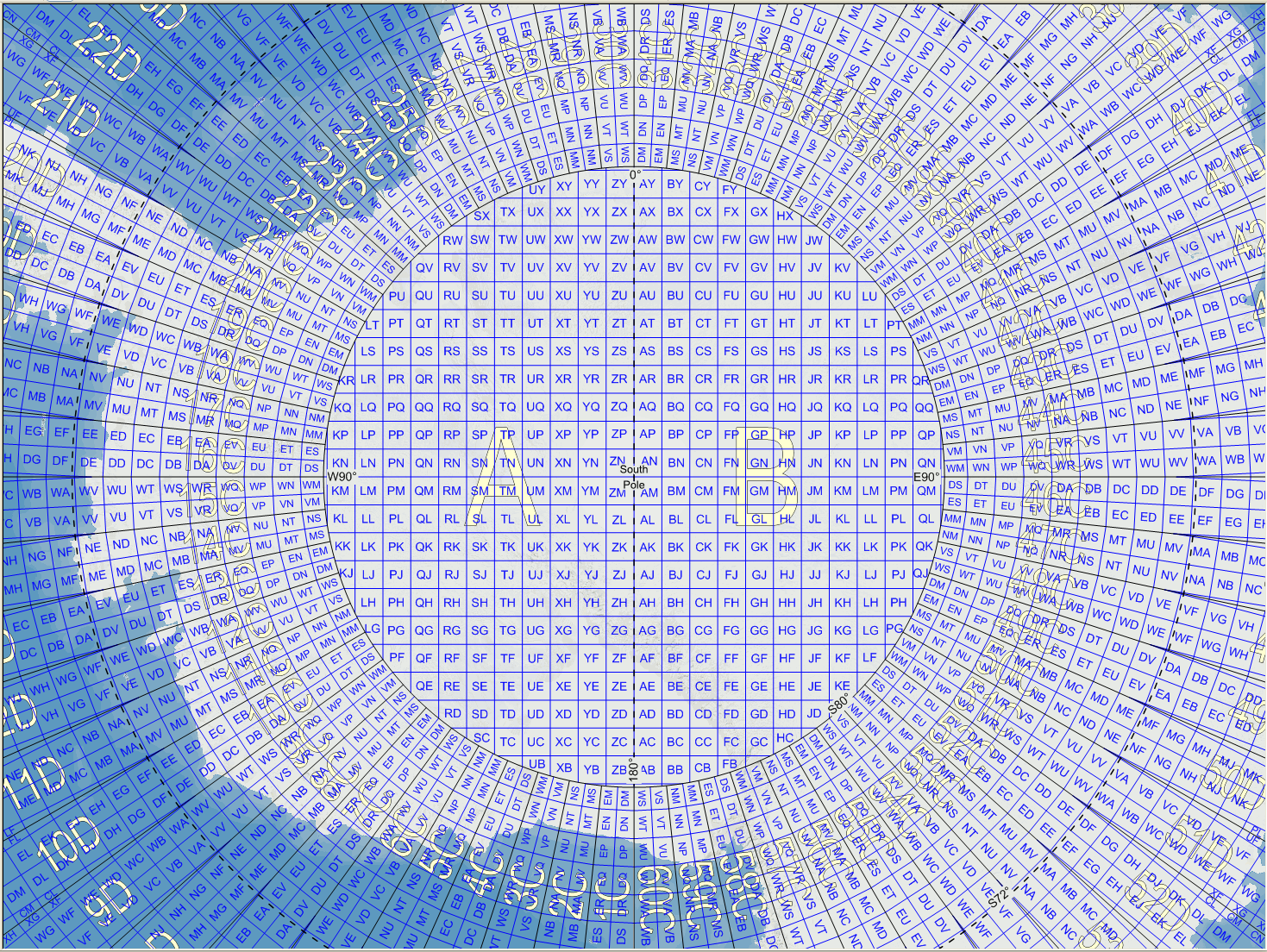
Figure 3. The MGRS grid around the South Pole.

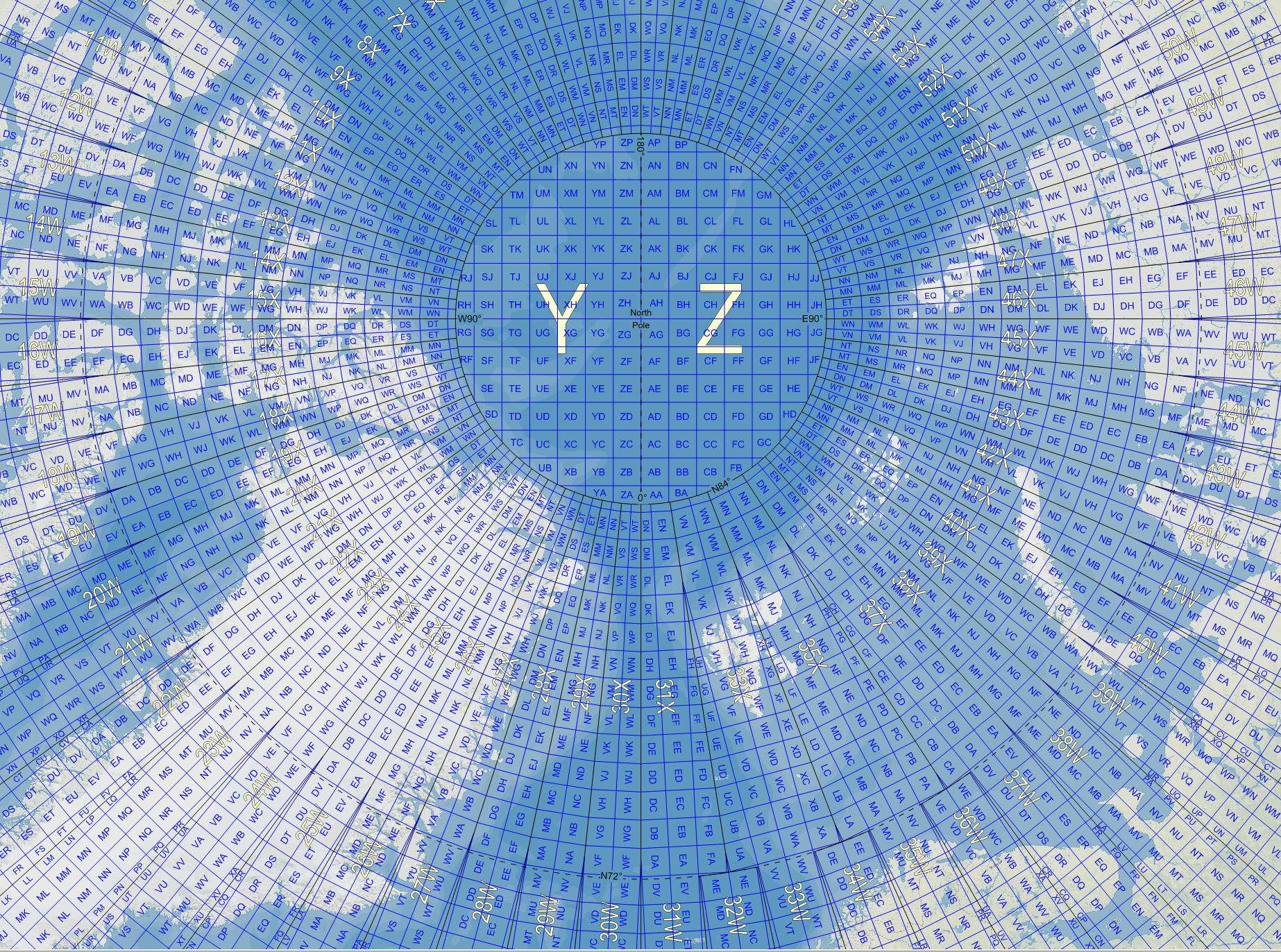
Figure 4. The MGRS grid around the North Pole.

In the polar regions, a different convention is used. South of 80°S, UPS South (Universal Polar Stereographic) is used instead of a UTM projection. The west half-circle forms a grid zone with designation A; the east half-circle forms one with designation B; see figure 3. North of 84°N, UPS North is used, and the west half-circle is Y, the east one is Z; see figure 4. Since the letters A, B, Y, and Z are not used for any latitude bands of UTM, their presence in an MGRS coordinate, with the omission of a zone number, indicates that the coordinates are in the UPS system.

The lettering scheme for 100,000 m squares is slightly different in the polar regions. The column letters use a more restricted alphabet, going from A to Z but omitting D, E, I, M, N, O, V, W; the columns are arranged so that the rightmost column in grid zone A and Y has column letter Z, and the next column in grid zone B or Z starts over with column letter A. The row letters go from A to Z, omitting I and O. The restricted column alphabet for UPS ensures that no UPS square will be adjacent to a UTM square with the same identification.

In the polar regions, there is only one version of the lettering scheme.

== See also ==
There are other geographic naming systems of this alphanumeric kind:

- Global Area Reference System (GARS) has been adopted by the National Geospatial-Intelligence Agency for use across the Department of Defense for certain applications. GARS defines areas of 30×30, 15×15, and no smaller than 5×5 minutes of latitude and longitude.
- Ordnance Survey National Grid is another Transverse Mercator system designed for locations in the British Isles
- Irish Transverse Mercator has replaced the Irish grid reference system
- United States National Grid (USNG), developed by the Federal Geographic Data Committee, is an implementation of MGRS for the United States and its possessions.
- World Geographic Reference System (GEOREF) has been used for air navigation, but is rarely seen today.
- Maidenhead Locator System is used by amateur radio operators.
- Natural Area Code
