= Hellenic Military Geographical Service =

Coordinates: 37°59′42.5″N 23°44′18″E

- Coat of Arms of the Hellenic Military Geographical Service.
- Active: 1889-present
- Country: Greece
- Branch: Hellenic Army
- Type: Mapping Agency
- Role: To compile topographic and cadastral maps of Greece.

The Hellenic Military Geographical Service or HMGS (Greek: Γεωγραφική Υπηρεσία Στρατού or Γ.Υ.Σ.), is the Hellenic Military's mapping agency.

== History ==
Established in 1889 as the “Geodetic Mission” with the purpose of compiling the “Topographic and Cadastral Map of the Country”, the service acquired its current name in 1926. Today, it supports both the Greek Army and the general public with cartographic products.

From 1966 until the 1980s, the service housed the Armed Forces Information Service, Greece's second state-run broadcaster alongside the National Radio Foundation.

== Maps ==
=== City plans ===
HMGS supplies City Plans of scales 1:5.000, 1:10.000 and 1:25.000 in Greek and Latin series

- 1:5.000 scale: covers 20 cities in Greece
- 1:10.000 scale: covers 16 cities in Greece

=== Topographic maps ===
HMGS produces and supplies topographic maps of various scales that cover the whole country and occasionally parts of neighboring countries. Not all maps noted below are available to the public. Part of them are confidential and available only upon approval of HMGS. Although not a state monopoly, and not very famous among hikers, certainly HMGS maps have a much wider coverage in small scales than commercial leisure maps. The maps use the Hellenic Geodetic Reference System 1987 (HGRS87 or ΕΓΣΑ'87) which specifies a Transverse Mercatorial Projection mapping Greece in one zone.

- 1:25.000 scale - 26 maps available for regions near Athens
- 1:50.000 scale - approximately 385 maps
- 1:100.000 scale - around 130 maps available
- 1:250.000 scale - 32 maps available
- 1:500.000 scale - 10 maps available
- 1:1.000.000 scale - 5 maps available

== Availability ==
The products and services of HMGS are not available in the market. They can either be purchased using the e-shop of the service or collected from the offices of the service upon submitting the relevant request form.

== See also ==
- Hellenic Geodetic Reference System 1987
