= List of national coordinate reference systems =

The list of national coordinate reference systems (CRS) lists map projections officially recommended for existing countries. Given that every projection gives deformations, each country's needs are different in order to reduce these distortions. These national projections, or national Coordinate Reference Systems are officially announced by the relevant national agencies. The list below is a collection of available official national projected Coordinate Reference Systems. Links to the relevant unique identification codes of the EPSG Geodetic Parameter Dataset, the most comprehensive collection Coordinate Reference Systems, are provided in the table.

== Table ==
Country	CRS name	EPSG code	Area of interest^{[A]}
Argentina	POSGAR 2007	EPSG:5342	
Belgium	Lambert 2008	EPSG:3812	
France	Lambert-93	EPSG:2154	Metropolitan France
Greece	Greek Grid	EPSG:2100	
Hungary	Egységes országos vetület	EPSG:23700	
Iraq	Iraq National Grid	EPSG:3893	
Ireland	Irish grid reference system		Ireland including Northern Ireland
Israel	Israeli Transverse Mercator	EPSG:2039	Israel & Palestinian territories
Netherlands	Stelsel van de Rijksdriehoeksmeting (RD)	EPSG:28992	European Netherlands
New Zealand	New Zealand Transverse Mercator	EPSG:2193	
Sweden	Swedish grid		
Switzerland	LV95	EPSG:2056	Switzerland & Liechtenstein
United Kingdom	British National Grid	EPSG:27700	Great Britain
United States	United States National Grid		
Vietnam	VN-2000	EPSG:4756	

^{A}If the CRS covers more or less than the country

== See also ==
- List of map projections

== Sources ==
- Annoni, A; Luzet, C; Gubler, E; Ihde, J (2001), Map projections for Europe (PDF), Institute for Environment and Sustainability for the European Commission
- Coordinate Reference Systems in Europe, CRS-geo.eu, archived from the original on 2018-03-07
- Geodesy Subcommittee of OGP, EPSG Geodetic Parameter Dataset, (International Association of) Oil and Gas Producers (OGP)
- Geodesy Subcommittee of OGP (2012), EPSG Area Polygons, (International Association of) Oil and Gas Producers (OGP), archived from the original on 2013-05-31 (Download Shapefile 2012.11)
