= Bermuda National Grid =

The Bermuda National Grid 2000 (BNG) is a kind of Transverse Mercator projection. It is not a Universal Transverse Mercator (UTM) projection, as it has an origin and other parameters that are different from those used in UTM.

Grid Parameters:

Origin latitude	32.0 degrees (North)
Origin longitude	-64.75 degrees (East)
Scale	1.0
Reference ellipsoid	WGS84
False easting	550,000.0 meters
False northing	100,000.0 meters
