= State Plane Coordinate System =

Set of geographic coordinate systems for regions of the United States

The State Plane Coordinate System (SPCS) is a projected coordinate system consisting of set of 125 geographic zones designed for specific regions of the United States. Each U.S. state contains one or more state plane zones, the boundaries of which usually follow county lines. There are 108 zones in the contiguous United States, with 10 more in Alaska, five in Hawaii, one for Puerto Rico and the United States Virgin Islands, and one for Guam. The system is widely used for geographic data by state and local governments.

Its popularity is due to at least two factors. First, it uses a simple Cartesian coordinate system to specify locations rather than a more complex spherical coordinate system (the geographic coordinate system of latitude and longitude). By using the Cartesian coordinate system's simple XY coordinates, plane surveying methods can be used, speeding up and simplifying calculations. Second, the system is highly accurate within each zone (error less than 1:10,000). Outside a specific state plane zone accuracy rapidly declines, thus the system is not useful for regional or national mapping.

Most state plane zones are based on either a transverse Mercator projection or a Lambert conformal conic projection. The choice between the two map projections is based on the shape of the state and its zones. States that are long in the east–west direction are typically divided into zones that are also long east–west. These zones use the Lambert conformal conic projection, because it is good at maintaining accuracy along an east–west axis, due to the projection cone intersecting the Earth's surface along two lines of latitude. Zones that are long in the north–south direction use the transverse Mercator projection because it is better at maintaining accuracy along a north–south axis, due to the circumference of the projection cylinder being oriented along a meridian of longitude. The panhandle of Alaska, whose maximum dimension is on a diagonal, uses an Oblique Mercator projection, which minimizes the combined error in the X and Y directions.

== History ==
In 1933, the North Carolina Department of Transportation asked the United States Coast and Geodetic Survey to assist in creating a comprehensive method for converting curvilinear coordinates (latitude and longitude) to a user-friendly, 2-dimensional Cartesian coordinate system. This request developed into the State Plane Coordinate System (SPCS), which is now the most widely used expression of coordinate information in local and regional surveying and mapping applications in the United States and its territories. It has been revised several times since then. When computers began to be used for mapping and GIS, the state plane system's cartesian grid system and simplified calculations made spatial processing faster and spatial data easier to work with.

Even though computer processing power has improved radically since the early days of GIS, the size of spatial datasets and the complexity of geoprocessing tasks being demanded of computers have also increased. Thus the state plane coordinate system is still useful.

Originally, the state plane coordinate systems were based on the North American Datum of 1927 (NAD27). Later, the more accurate North American Datum of 1983 (NAD83) became the standard (a geodetic datum is the way a coordinate system is linked to the physical Earth). More recently there has been an effort to increase the accuracy of the NAD83 datum using technology that was not available in 1983. These efforts are known as "High Accuracy Reference Network" (HARN) or "High Precision GPS Network" (HPGN). In addition, the basic unit of distance used is sometimes feet and sometimes meters. Thus a fully described coordinate system often looks something like: "Washington State Plane North, NAD83 HARN, US Survey feet". This information is needed in order to accurately transform data from one coordinate system to another.

== Problems ==
The main problem with the state plane coordinate system is that each zone uses a different coordinate system. This is not a major problem as long as one's needs are within the boundaries of a given state plane zone, as is the case with most county and city governments. However, the need to transform spatial data from one coordinate system to another can be burdensome. Sometimes a regional area of interest—such as a metropolitan area covering several counties—crosses a state plane zone boundary. The Seattle metropolitan area in Washington is an example of this. King County, which includes the City of Seattle, uses the "Washington State Plane North" coordinate system, while Pierce County, which includes the City of Tacoma, uses "Washington State Plane South". Thus any regional agency that wants to combine regional data from local governments has to transform at least some data into a common coordinate system.

== State Plane Coordinate System of 2022 ==
The National Geodetic Survey has announced a modernization of the National Spatial Reference System, and a replacement of the state plane coordinate system will be part of the modernization. The number of zones will be substantially higher than the 1983 system. One new feature will be a state-wide zone for projects that extend over more than one zone. The NGS expects to release the new spatial reference system and new zones in 2025. As with earlier systems, the name of the new system, State Plane Coordinate System of 2022, indicates a year earlier than the actual year of release.

== See also ==
- Public Land Survey System
- Universal Transverse Mercator coordinate system
