= Hellenic Geodetic Reference System 1987 =

The Hellenic Geodetic Reference System 1987 or HGRS87 (Greek: Ελληνικό Γεωδαιτικό Σύστημα Αναφοράς 1987 or ΕΓΣΑ'87) is a geodetic system commonly used in Greece (SRID=2100). The system specifies a local geodetic datum and a projection system. In some documents it is called Greek Geodetic Reference System 1987 or GGRS87.

== HGRS87 datum ==
HGRS87 specifies a non-geocentric datum that is tied to the coordinates of the key geodetic station at the Dionysos Satellite Observatory (DSO) northeast of Athens (38.078400°N 23.932939°E). The central pedestal (CP) at this location has by definition HGRS87 coordinates 38° 4' 33.8000" N - 23° 55' 51.0000"E, N = +7 m.

Although HGRS87 uses the GRS80 ellipsoid, the origin is shifted relative to the GRS80 geocenter, so that the ellipsoidal surface is best for Greece. The specified offsets relative to WGS84 (WGS84-HGRS87) are: Δx = -199.87 m, Δy = 74.79 m, Δz = 246.62 m.

The HGRS87 datum is implemented by a first order geodetic network, which consists of approximately 30 triangulation stations throughout Greece and is maintained by the Hellenic Military Geographical Service. The initial uncertainty was estimated as 0.1 ppm (1 × 10^{−7}). However, there are considerable tectonic movements that move parts of Greece towards different directions, causing incompatibilities between surveys taking place at different times.

HGRS87 replaced an earlier de facto geodetic system. The datum of that system was based on the Bessel ellipsoid, with an accurate determination of the geodetic coordinates at the central premises of the National Observatory of Athens 37° 58' 20.1" N - 23° 42' 58.5"E with current Google Earth TM coordinates:37° 58' 20.20" N - 23° 43' 05.36"E and supplemented by an accurately measured azimuth from the observatory to Mount Parnes. Cartographic projections for civilian use were based on the Hatt projection system, with different projection parameters for each 1:100000 map.

== HGRS87 projection ==
HGRS87 also specifies a transverse Mercator cartographic projection (TM) with m_{0}=0.9996, covering six degrees of longitude either side of 24 degrees east (18-30 degrees east). This way all Greek territory (stretching to approximately 9° of longitude) is projected in one zone. References are in meters. Northings are counted from the equator. A false easting of 500000 m is assigned to the central meridian (24° east), so eastings are always positive.

Conversion from geographical coordinates in GRS80 to a projection in HGRS87 is supported by PROJ with appropriate parameters. The conversion is performed with the following code (shell command line):

proj +proj=tmerc +lat_0=0 +lon_0=24 +k=0.9996 +x_0=500000 +y_0=0 +ellps=GRS80 +towgs84=-199.87,74.79,246.62,0,0,0,0 +units=m +no_defs

== Migration to HTRS07 ==
While HGRS87 is still widely used for most civilian uses, it is partly replaced by the new Hellenic Terrestrial Reference System 2007 or HTRS07 (SRID=96758). HTRS07, which was specified for the Hellenic Positioning System (HEPOS) project, is GPS based and is compatible with European Terrestrial Reference System 1989 (ETRS89). HTRS07 is currently used for the cadastral surveys.

== Converters ==
- SurvoGR online converter (updated 2023)
- Online conversion among WGS84 / EGSA87 / HRTS07 / HATT (THEMOS SA)
- Matlab & C functions converting between WGS84 / EGSA87

== See also ==
- Hellenic Military Geographical Service
