= Business News Group =

Business News Group (BNG) is a publishing company based in Monterrey, northern Mexico. The company is engaged in several activities, chief among them the publication of the weekly business newspaper Biznews, custom publishing, plus outsourced design and content services.

== Biznews North Mexico ==
BNG's flagship product is Biznews, published since 1999 and distributed throughout the six northern Mexican states that share the border with the USA (Baja California, Sonora, Chihuahua, Coahuila, Nuevo León and Tamaulipas), as well as subscribers in Mexico City and in other states, plus distribution in the cities of the southwest USA located close to the international border. Biznews is published in Spanish, although its website often includes special sections produced in English. Biznews is Mexico's only regional business publication, and is focused on issues involving Mexico's northern states and the border region. This region is Mexico's economic powerhouse: the six Mexican border states represent just 17% of Mexico's population yet produce almost 25% of the nation's GDP.

=== History ===
The newspaper's founding partners in 1999 were Luke Betts and Carlos Chávez. Biznews was operated until 2005 by the company Business Communications Group, at which time the original partners, Betts and Chávez, decided to split the company's assets. Ownership and operation of Biznews was taken over by Monterrey-based company Business News Group, owned by Betts. The remainder of the original company's operations (principally commercial representation of national media), was taken over by Chavez's new company Commercial Media Bizcom, which is based in Mexico City and is the commercial representative for Biznews in the Mexican capital.
Among its awards, Biznews won the 2000 "Media of the Year" award designated by Mexico's advertising and marketing magazine NEO.

== Outsourcing agreement with ImpreMedia ==
In November 2009, BNG signed an agreement with ImpreMedia, the largest Spanish language print and online publisher in the US, to design, format and produce advertisements and editorial pages for impreMedia's printed publications. This was the most far-reaching outsourcing agreement ever in the US Spanish-language newspaper market, and marked BNG's incursion into the growing international market of outsourced design and editorial services. ImpreMedia had previously entered into an agreement with Mexico City-based LatinWeb to outsource all the back-end and support work of its digital products. The BNG/ImpreMedia agreement was dubbed a "NAFTA classic" in the influential column "Fitz and Jen" in the industry magazine Editor and Publisher, referring to the fact that a US company run by a Canadian newspaper veteran (then ImpreMedia CEO John Paton) that serves a primarily Mexican audience in the United States was outsourcing its design work to a company in Mexico also run by a Canadian newspaper veteran (BNG president Luke Betts). The agreement covers ImpreMedia's daily newspapers La Opinión of Los Angeles and El Diario of New York, plus the weeklies El Mensajero (San Francisco), Rumbo (Houston), La Raza (Chicago) and La Prensa (Orlando).

== Other projects ==
BNG publishes specialized products as well, such as an annual magazine for Mexico's Tourism Board, used to promote the country's congress and convention industry. In 2009 the magazine went under the title of Let's Meet in Mexico, and for 2010 was named Mexico Where Worlds Meet. Other federal government clients include ProMexico, the country's trade and investment promotion agency, for which BNG has produced promotional texts in English and Spanish. The company also works with a variety of state-level tourism and economic development ministries. Private sector clients include the national hotel chain Camino Real and Centro Banamex, Mexico City's largest convention center.
