= Universal polar stereographic coordinate system =

The two grids covering the Arctic and Antarctic

The universal polar stereographic (UPS) projected coordinate system is based on a conformal map projection of the Earth spheroid. It is used in conjunction with the universal transverse Mercator (UTM) coordinate system to locate positions on the surface of the Earth. UPS covers the Earth's polar regions, specifically the areas north of 84°N and south of 80°S, which are not covered by the UTM grids, plus an additional 30 minutes of latitude extending into UTM grid to provide some overlap between the two systems.

In the polar regions, directions can become complicated, with all geographic north–south lines converging at the poles. The difference between UPS grid north and true north can therefore be anything up to 180°—in some places, grid north is true south, and vice versa. UPS grid north is arbitrarily defined as being along the prime meridian in the Antarctic and the 180th meridian in the Arctic; thus, east and west on the grids when moving directly away from the pole are along the 90°E and 90°W meridians respectively.

== Projection system ==
As the name indicates the UPS system uses a stereographic map projection, specifically a secant version based on an elliptical model of the earth. The scale factor at each pole is adjusted to 0.994 so that the latitude of true scale is 81.11451786859362545° (about 81° 06' 52.3") North and South. The scale factor inside the regions at latitudes higher than this parallel is too small, whereas the regions at latitudes below this line have scale factors that are too large, reaching 1.0016 at 80° latitude.

The scale factor at the origin (the poles) is adjusted to minimize the overall distortion of scale within the mapped region. As with the Mercator projection, the region near the tangent (or secant) point on a Stereographic map remains very close to true scale for an angular distance of a few degrees. In the ellipsoidal model, a stereographic projection tangent to the pole has a scale factor of less than 1.003 at 84° latitude and 1.008 at 80° latitude. The adjustment of the scale factor in the UPS projection reduces the average scale distortion over the entire zone.
