= Discrete global grid =

Partition of Earth's surface into subdivided cells

A discrete global grid (DGG) is a mosaic that covers the entire Earth's surface. Mathematically it is a space partitioning: it consists of a set of non-empty regions that form a partition of the Earth's surface. In a usual grid-modeling strategy, to simplify position calculations, each region is represented by a point, abstracting the grid as a set of region-points. Each region or region-point in the grid is called a cell.

When each cell of a grid is subject to a recursive partition, resulting in a "series of discrete global grids with progressively finer resolution", forming a hierarchical grid, it is called a hierarchical DGG (sometimes "global hierarchical tessellation" or "DGG system").

Discrete global grids are used as the geometric basis for the building of geospatial data structures. Each cell is related with data objects or values, or (in the hierarchical case) may be associated with other cells. DGGs have been proposed for use in a wide range of geospatial applications, including vector and raster location representation, data fusion, and spatial databases.

The most usual grids are for horizontal position representation, using a standard datum, like WGS84. In this context, it is common also to use a specific DGG as foundation for geocoding standardization.

In the context of a spatial index, a DGG can assign unique identifiers to each grid cell, using it for spatial indexing purposes, in geodatabases or for geocoding.

== Reference model of the globe ==
The "globe", in the DGG concept, has no strict semantics, but in geodesy a so-called "grid reference system" is a grid that divides space with precise positions relative to a datum, that is an approximated "standard model of the Geoid". So, in the role of Geoid, the "globe" covered by a DGG can be any of the following objects:

- The topographical surface of the Earth, when each cell of the grid has its surface-position coordinates and the elevation in relation to the standard Geoid. Example: grid with coordinates (φ,λ,z) where z is the elevation.
- A standard Geoid surface. The z coordinate is zero for all grid, thus can be omitted, (φ,λ).
  Ancient standards, before 1687 (the Newton's Principia publication), used a "reference sphere"; in nowadays the Geoid is mathematically abstracted as reference ellipsoid.
  - A simplified Geoid: sometimes an old geodesic standard (e.g. SAD69) or a non-geodesic surface (e. g. perfectly spherical surface) must be adopted, and will be covered by the grid. In this case, cells must be labeled with non-ambiguous way, (φ',λ'), and the transformation (φ,λ) ⟾ (φ′,λ′) must be known.
- A projection surface. Typically the geographic coordinates (φ,λ) are projected (with some distortion) onto the 2D mapping plane with 2D Cartesian coordinates (x, y).

As a global modeling process, modern DGGs, when including projection process, tend to avoid surfaces like cylinder or a conic solids that result in discontinuities and indexing problems. Regular polyhedra and other topological equivalents of sphere led to the most promising known options to be covered by DGGs, because "spherical projections preserve the correct topology of the Earth – there are no singularities or discontinuities to deal with".

When working with a DGG, it is important to specify which of these options was adopted. So, the characterization of the reference model of the globe of a DGG can be summarized by:

- The recovered object: the object type in the role of globe. If there is no projection, the object covered by the grid is the Geoid, the Earth or a sphere; else, it is the geometry class of the projection surface (e.g. a cylinder, a cube or a cone).
- Projection type: absent (no projection) or present. When present, its characterization can be summarized by the projection's goal property (e.g. equal-area, conformal, etc.) and the class of the corrective function (e.g. trigonometric, linear, quadratic, etc.).

NOTE: When the DGG is covering a projection surface, in a context of data provenance, the metadata about its reference Geoid is also important — typically specifying its ISO 19111's CRS value, with no confusion with the projection surface.

== Types ==
The main distinguishing feature to classify or compare DGGs is the use or not of hierarchical grid structures:

- In hierarchical reference systems each cell is a "box reference" to a subset of cells, and cell identifiers can express this hierarchy in its numbering logic or structure.
- In non-hierarchical reference systems each cell have a distinct identifier and represents a fixed-scale region of the space. The discretization of the Latitude/Longitude system is the most popular, and the standard reference for conversions.

Other usual criteria to classify a DGG are tile-shape and granularity (grid resolution):

- Tile regularity and shape: there are regular, semi-regular or irregular grid. As in generic tilings by regular polygons, is possible to tiling with regular face (like wall tiles can be rectangular, triangular, hexagonal, etc.), or with same face type but changing its size or angles, resulting in semi-regular shapes.
  Uniformity of shape and regularity of metrics provide better grid-indexing algorithms. Although it has less practical use, totally irregular grids are possible, such in a Voronoi coverage.
- Fine or coarse granulation (cell size): modern DGGs are parametrizable in its grid resolution, so, it is a characteristic of the final DGG instance, but not useful to classify DGGs, except when the DGG-type must use a specific resolution or have a discretization limit. A "fine" granulation grid is non-limited and "coarse" refers to drastic limitation. Historically the main limitations are related to digital/analogic media, the compression/expanded representations of the grid in a database, and the memory limitations to store the grid. When a quantitative characterization is necessary, the average area of the grid cells or average distance between cell centers can be adopted.

== Examples ==
=== Non-hierarchical grids ===
The most common class of discrete global grids are those that place cell center points on longitude/latitude meridians and parallels, or which use the longitude/latitude meridians and parallels to form the boundaries of rectangular cells. Examples of such grids, all based on latitude/longitude:

UTM zones: Divides the Earth into sixty (strip) zones, each being a six-degree band of longitude. In digital media removes overlapping zone. Use secant transverse Mercator projection in each zone. Define 60 secant cylinders, 1 per zone. The UTM zones was enhanced by Military Grid Reference System (MGRS), by addition of the Latitude bands.				
inception: 1940s	covered object: cylinder (60 options)	projection: UTM or latlong	irregular tiles: polygonal strips	granularity: coarse

(modern) UTM – Universal Transverse Mercator: Is a discretization of the continuous UTM grid, with a kind of 2-level hierarchy, where the first level (coarse grain) correspond to the "UTM zones with latitude bands" (the MGRS), use the same 60 cylinders as reference-projection objects. Each fine-grain cell is designated by a structured ID composed by "grid zone designator", "the 100,000-meter square identifier" and "numerical location". The grid resolution is a direct function of the number of digits in the coordinates, that is also standardized. For instance the cell 17N 630084 4833438 is a ~10mx10m square. PS: this standard use 60 distinct cylinders for projections. There are also "Regional Transverse Mercator" (RTM or UTM Regional) and "Local Transverse Mercator" (LTM or UTM Local) standards, with more specific cylinders, for better fit and precision at the point of interest.				
inception: 1950s	covered object: cylinder (60 options)	projection: UTM	rectangular tiles: equal-angle (conformal)	granularity: fine

ISO 6709: Discretizes the traditional "graticule" representation and the modern numeric-coordinate cell-based locations. The granularity is fixed by a simple convention of the numeric representation, e. g. one-degree graticule, .01 degree graticule, etc. and it results in non-equal-area cells over the grid. The shape of the cells are rectangular except in the poles, where they are triangular. The numeric representation is standardized by two main conventions: degrees (Annex D) and decimal (Annex F). The grid resolution is controlled by the number of digits (Annex H).				
inception: 1983	covered object: Geoid (any ISO 19111's CRS)	projection: none	rectangular tiles: uniform spheroidal shape	granularity: fine

Primary DEM (TIN DEM): A vector-based triangular irregular network (TIN) — the TIN DEM dataset is also referred to as a primary (measured) DEM. Many DEM are created on a grid of points placed at a regular angular increments of latitude and longitude. Examples include the Global 30 Arc-Second Elevation Dataset (GTOPO30). and the Global Multi-resolution Terrain Elevation Data 2010 (GMTED2010). Triangulated irregular network is a representation of a continuous surface consisting entirely of triangular facets.				
inception: 1970s	covered object: terrain	projection: none	triangular non-uniform tiles: parametrized (vectorial)	granularity: fine

Arakawa grids: Was used for Earth system models for meteorology and oceanography — for example, the Global Environmental Multiscale Model (GEM) uses Arakawa grids for Global Climate Modeling. The called "A-grid" the reference DGG, to be compared with other DGGs. Used in the 1980s with ~500x500 space resolutions.
inception: 1977	covered object: geoid	projection: ?	rectangular tiles: parametric, space-time	granularity: medium

WMO squares: A specialized grid, used uniquely by NOAA, divides a chart of the world with latitude-longitude gridlines into grid cells of 10° latitude by 10° longitude, each with a unique, 4-digit numeric identifier (the first digit identifies quadrants NE/SE/SW/NW).
inception: 2001	covered object: geoid	projection: none	Regular tiles: 36x18 rectangular cells	granularity: coarse

World Grid Squares: Are a compatible extension of Japanese Grid Squares standardized in Japan Industrial Standards (JIS X0410) to worldwide. The World Grid Square code can identify grid squares covering the world based on nine layers. We can express a grid square by using from 6 to 16 digit sequence with accordance to its resolution.
inception: 2015	covered object: geoid	projection: none	Regular tiles: rectangular cells	granularity: coarse,medium,fine

=== Hierarchical grids ===
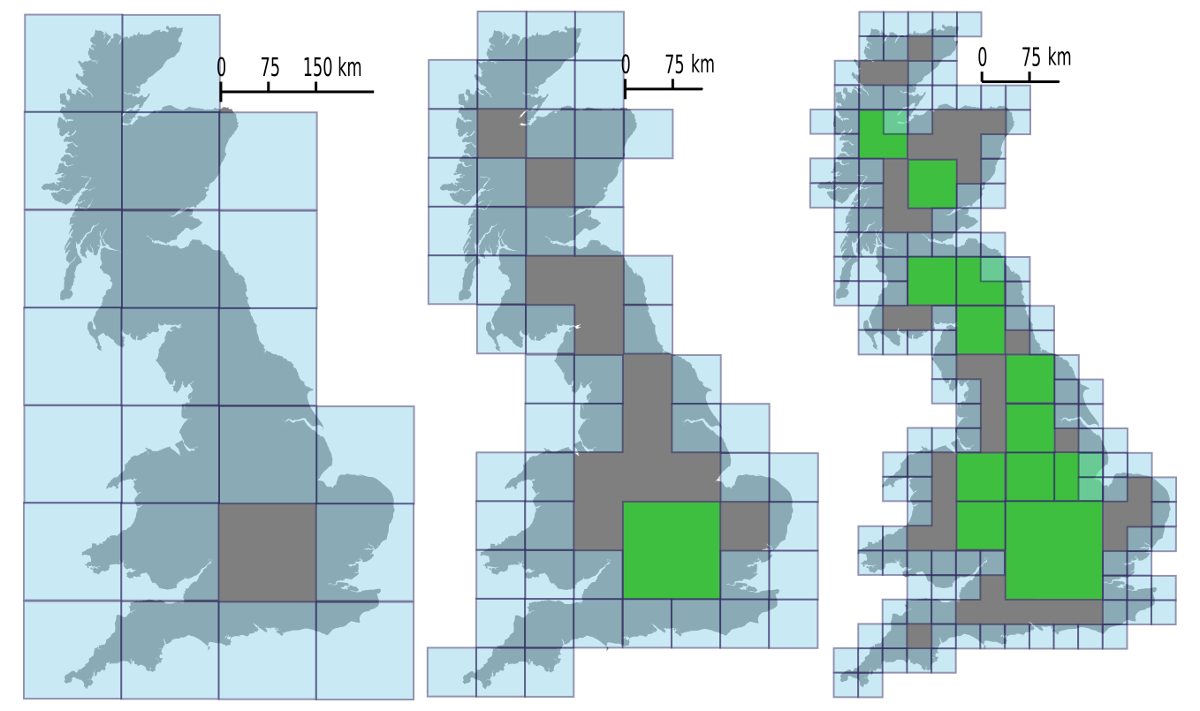
Successive space partitioning. The grey-and-green grid in the second and third maps are hierarchical.

The right aside illustration show 3 boundary maps of the coast of Great Britain. The first map was covered by a grid-level-0 with 150 km size cells. Only a grey cell in the center, with no need of zoom for detail, remains level-0; all other cells of the second map was partitioned into four-cells-grid (grid-level-1), each with 75 km. In the third map 12 cells level-1 remains as grey, all other was partitioned again, each level-1-cell transformed into a level-2-grid.
Examples of DGGs that use such recursive process, generating hierarchical grids, include:

ISEA discrete global grids (ISEA DGGs): are a class of grids proposed by researchers at Oregon State University. The grid cells are created as regular polygons on the surface of an icosahedron, and then inversely projected using the Icosahedral Snyder Equal Area (ISEA) map projection to form equal area cells on the sphere. The icosahedron's orientation with respect to the Earth may be optimized for different criteria. Cells may be hexagons, triangles, or quadrilaterals. Multiple resolutions are indicated by choosing an aperture, or ratio between cell areas at consecutive resolutions. Some applications of ISEA DGGs include data products generated by the European Space Agency's Soil Moisture and Ocean Salinity (SMOS) satellite, which uses an ISEA4H9 (aperture 4 Hexagonal DGGS resolution 9), and the commercial software Global Grid Systems Insight, which uses an ISEA3H (aperture 3 Hexagonal DGGS).
inception: 1992..2004	covered object: ?	projection: equal-area	parametrized (hexagons, triangles or quadrilaterals) tiles: equal-area	granularity: fine

IVEA discrete global grids (IVEA DGGs): are a class of grids related to ISEA but using Icosahedral Vertex-oriented great circle Equal Area to avoid the sharp cusps and concave hexagons of ISEA.
inception: 2006?	covered object: ?	projection: equal-area	parametrized (hexagons, triangles or quadrilaterals) tiles: equal-area	granularity: fine

COBE – Quadrilateralized Spherical cube: Cube: Similar decomposition of sphere tham HEALPix and S2. But does not use space-filling curve, edges are not geodesics, and projection is more complicated.
inception: 1975..1991	covered object: cube	projection: Curvilinear perspective	quadrilateral tiles: uniform area-preserving	granularity: fine

Quaternary Triangular Mesh (QTM): QTM has triangular-shaped cells created by the 4-fold recursive subdivision of a spherical octahedron.
inception: 1999 ... 2005	covered object: octahedron (or other)	projection: Lambert's equal-area cylindrical	triangular tiles: uniform area-preserved	granularity: fine

Hierarchical Equal Area isoLatitude Pixelization (HEALPix): HEALPix has equal area quadrilateral-shaped cells and was originally developed for use with full-sky astrophysical data sets. The usual projection is "H?4, K?3 HEALPix projection". Main advantage, comparing with others of same indexing niche as S2, "is suitable for calculations involving spherical harmonics".				
inception: 2006	covered object: Geoid	projection: (K,H) parametrized HEALPix projection	quadrilateral tiles: uniform area-preserved	granularity: fine

Hierarchical Triangular Mesh (HTM): Developed in 2003...2007, HTM "is a multi level, recursive decomposition of the sphere. It start with an octahedron, let this be level 0. As you project the edges of the octahedron onto the (unit) sphere creates 8 spherical triangles, 4 on the Northern and 4 on the Southern hemispheres". Then, each triangle is refined into 4 subtriangles (1-to-4 split). The first public operational version seems the HTM-v2 in 2004.				
inception: 2004	covered object: Geoid	projection: none	triangular tiles: spherical equilateres	granularity: fine

Geohash: Latitude and longitude are merged, enterlacing bits in the joined number. The binary result is represented with base32, offering a compact human-readable code. When used as spatial index, corresponds to a Z-order curve. There are some variants like Geohash-36.				
inception: 2008	covered object: Geoid	projection: none	semi-regular tiles: rectangular	granularity: fine

S2 / S2Region: The "S2 Grid System" is part of the "S2 Geometry Library" (the name is derived from the mathematical notation for the n-sphere, S^{n}). It implements an index system based on cube projection and the space-filling Hilbert curve, developed at Google. The S2Region of S2 is the most general representation of its cells, where cell-position and metric (e.g. area) can be calculated. Each S2Region is a subgrid, resulting in a hierarchy limited to 31 levels. At level30 resolution is estimated in 1 cm^{2}, at level0 is 85011012 km^{2}. The cell-identifier of the hierarchical grid of a cube face (6 faces) have and ID of 60 bits (so "every cm^{2} on Earth can be represented using a 64-bit integer).				
inception: 2015	covered object: cube	projection: spherical projections in each cube face using quadratic function	semi-regular tiles: quadrilateral projections	granularity: fine

S2 / S2LatLng: The DGG supplied by S2LatLng representation, like an ISO 6709 grid, but hierarchical and with its specific cell shape.
inception: 2015	covered object: Geoid or sphere	projection: none	semi-regular tiles: quadrilateral	granularity: fine

S2 / S2CellId: The DGG supplied by S2CellId representation. Each cell-ID is a 64-bit unsigned integer unique identifier, for any hierarchy level.
inception: 2015	covered object: cube	projection: ?	semi-regular tiles: quadrilateral	granularity: fine

H3: The H3 DGG was developed and released by Uber in 2018. Each cell-ID is a 240-bit (30 bytes) unsigned integer unique identifier, for any hierarchy level. The area of pentagons and hexagons at the same resolution is not equal. As the resolution increases the ratio of the difference in areas increases for both pentagon to average hexagon area and for max to min hexagon area; at resolution 15 the ratios are ~0.505 pentagon to average hexagon area and ~1.99 max to min hexagon area.
inception: 2018	covered object: icosahedron	projection: Dymaxion	semi-regular hexagons tiles: unequal area	granularity: fine

== Standard equal-area hierarchical grids ==
There is a class of hierarchical DGG's named by the Open Geospatial Consortium (OGC) as "discrete global grid systems" (DGGS), that has to satisfy 18 requirements. Among them, what best distinguishes this class from other hierarchical DGGs, is the Requirement-8, "For each successive level of grid refinement, and for each cell geometry, (...) Cells that are equal area (...) within the specified level of precision".

A DGGS is designed as a framework for information as distinct from conventional coordinate reference systems originally designed for navigation. For a grid-based global spatial information framework to operate effectively as an analytical system it should be constructed using cells that represent the surface of the Earth uniformly. The DGGS standard includes in its requirements a set of functions and operations that the framework has to offer.

All DGGS's level-0 cells are equal area faces of a regular polyhedron.

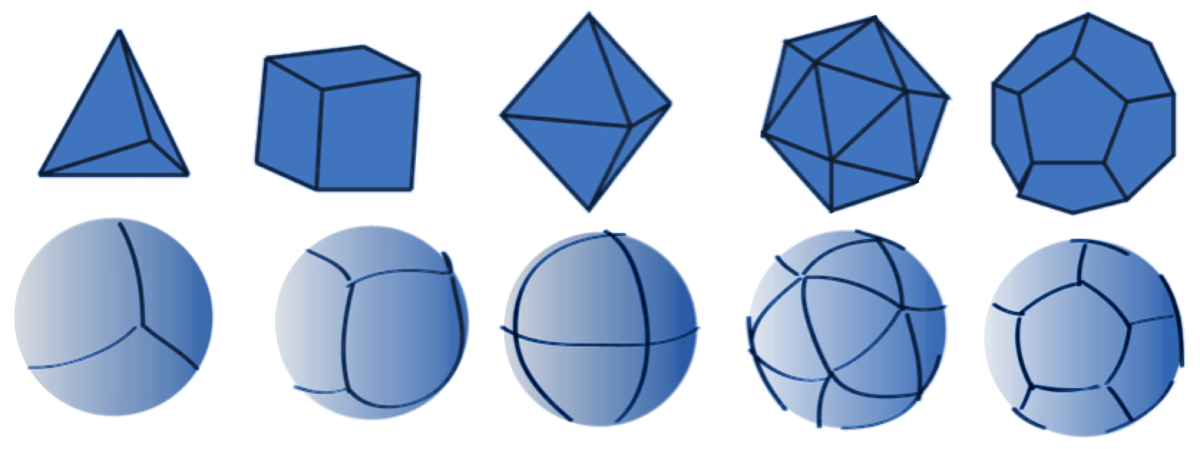
Regular polyhedra (top) and their corresponding equal area DGG

=== The DGGS framework ===
The standard defines the requirements of a hierarchical DGG, including how to operate the grid. Any DGG that satisfies these requirements can be named DGGS. "A DGGS specification SHALL include a DGGS Reference Frame and the associated Functional Algorithms as defined by the DGGS Core Conceptual Data Model".

For an Earth grid system to be compliant with this Abstract Specification it must define a hierarchical tessellation of equal area cells that both partition the entire Earth at multiple levels of granularity and provide a global spatial reference frame. The system must also include encoding methods to: address each cell; assign quantized data to cells; and perform algebraic operations on the cells and the data assigned to them. Main concepts of the DGGS Core Conceptual Data Model:

1. reference frame elements, and,
2. functional algorithm elements; comprising:
  1. quantization operations,
  2. algebraic operations, and
  3. interoperability operations.

== Database modeling ==
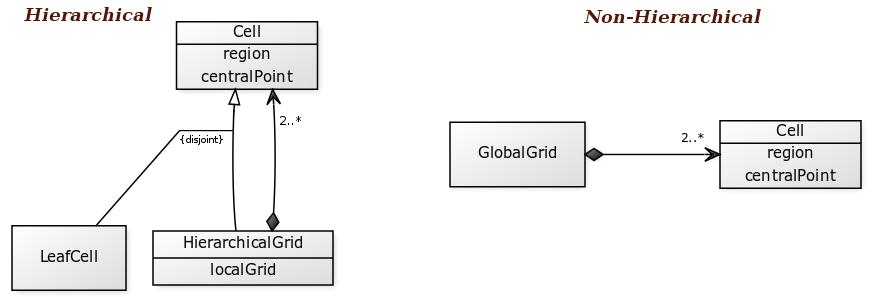
In all DGG databases the grid is a composition of its cells. The region and centralPoint are illustrated as typical properties or subclasses. The cell identifier (cell ID) is also an important property, used as internal index and/or as public label of the cell (instead the point-coordinates) in geocoding applications. Sometimes, as in the MGRS grid, the coordinates make the role of ID.

There are many DGGs because there are many representational, optimization and modeling alternatives. All DGG grid is a composition of its cells, and, in the Hierarchical DGG each cell uses a new grid over its local region.

The illustration is not adequate to TIN DEM cases and similar "raw data" structures, where the database not use the cell concept (that geometrically is the triangular region), but nodes and edges: each node is an elevation and each edge is the distance between two nodes.

In general, each cell of the DGG is identified by the coordinates of its region-point (illustrated as the centralPoint of a database representation). It is also possible, with loss of functionality, to use a "free identifier", that is, any unique number or unique symbolic label per cell, the cell ID. The ID is usually used as spatial index (such as internal Quadtree or k-d tree), but is also possible to transform ID into a human-readable label for geocoding applications.

Modern databases (e.g. using S2 grid) use also multiple representations for the same data, offering both, a grid (or cell region) based in the Geoid and a grid-based in the projection.

== History ==
Discrete global grids with cell regions defined by parallels and meridians of latitude/longitude have been used since the earliest days of global geospatial computing. Before it, the discretization of continuous coordinates for practical purposes, with paper maps, occurred only with low granularity. Perhaps the most representative and main example of DGG of this pre-digital era was the 1940s military UTM DGGs, with finer granulated cell identification for geocoding purposes. Similarly some hierarchical grid exists before geospatial computing, but only in coarse granulation.

A global surface is not required for use on daily geographical maps, and the memory was very expensive before the 2000s, to put all planetary data into the same computer. The first digital global grids were used for data processing of the satellite images and global (climatic and oceanographic) fluid dynamics modeling.

The first published references to hierarchical geodesic DGG systems are to systems developed for atmospheric modeling and published in 1968. These systems have hexagonal cell regions created on the surface of a spherical icosahedron.

The spatial hierarchical grids were subject to more intensive studies in the 1980s, when main structures, as Quadtree, were adapted in image indexing and databases.

While specific instances of these grids have been in use for decades, the term discrete global grids was coined by researchers at Oregon State University in 1997 to describe the class of all such entities.

... OGC standardization in 2017...

=== Comparison and evolution ===
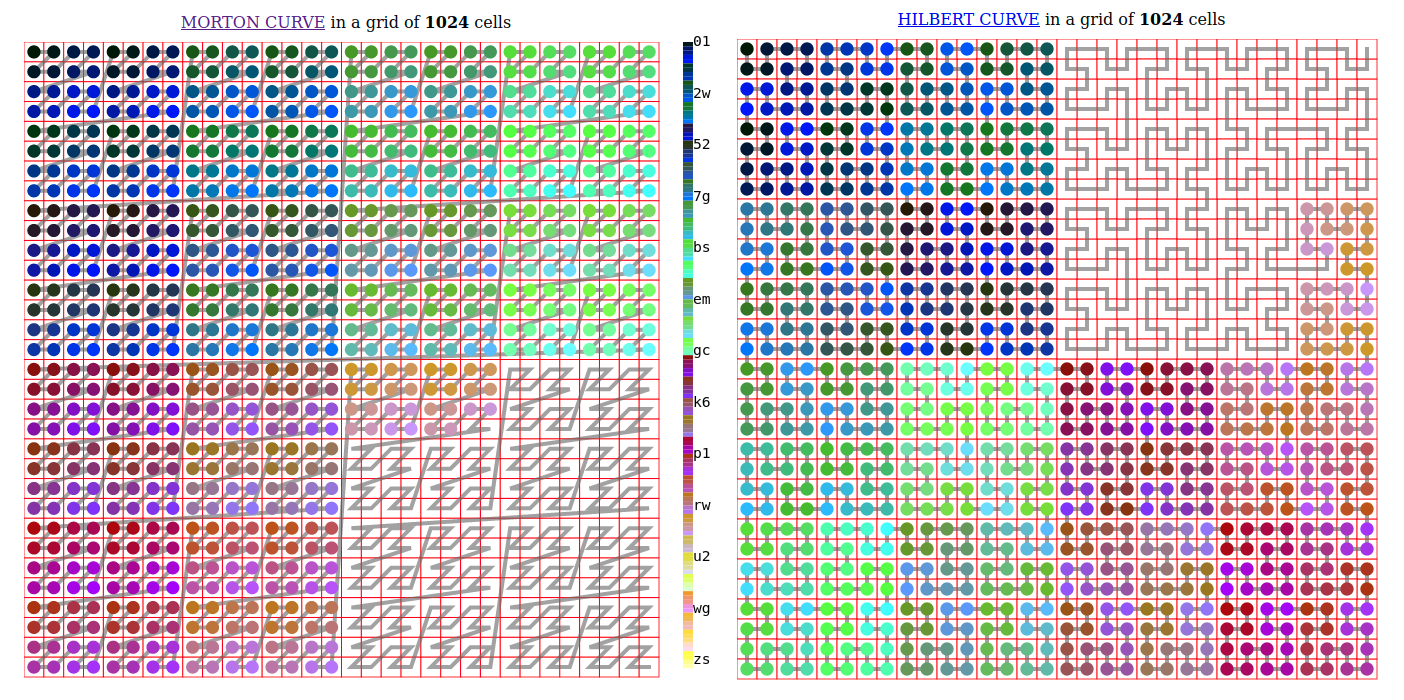
Comparing grid-cell identifier schemas of two different curves, Morton and Hilbert. The Hilbert curve was adopted in DGGs like S2-geometry, Morton curve in DGGs like Geohash. The adoption of Hilbert curve was an evolution because have less "jumps", preserving nearest cells as neighbours.

The evaluation discrete global grid consists of many aspects, including area, shape, compactness, etc. Evaluation methods for map projection, such as Tissot's indicatrix, are also suitable for evaluating map projection-based discrete global grid.

In addition, averaged ratio between complementary profiles (AveRaComp) gives a good evaluation of shape distortions for quadrilateral-shaped discrete global grid.

Database development-choices and adaptations are oriented by practical demands for greater performance, reliability or precision. The best choices are being selected and adapted to necessities, propitiating the evolution of the DGG architectures. Examples of this evolution process: from non-hierarchical to hierarchical DGGs; from the use of Z-curve indexes (a naive algorithm based in digits-interlacing), used by Geohash, to Hilbert-curve indexes, used in modern optimizations, like S2.

== Geocode variants ==
In general each cell of the grid is identified by the coordinates of its region-point, but it is also possible to simplify the coordinate syntax and semantics, to obtain an identifier, as in a classic alphanumeric grids — and find the coordinates of a region-point from its identifier. Small and fast coordinate representations is a goal in the cell-ID implementations, for any DGG solutions.

There is no loss of functionality when using a "free identifier" instead of a coordinate, that is, any unique number (or unique symbolic label) per region-point, the cell ID. So, to transform a coordinate into a human-readable label, and/or compressing the length of the label, is an additional step in the grid representation. This representation is named geocode.

Some popular "global place codes" as ISO 3166-1 alpha-2 for administrative regions or Longhurst code for ecological regions of the globe, are partial in globe's coverage. By other hand, any set of cell-identifiers of a specific DGG can be used as "full-coverage place codes". Each different set of IDs, when used as a standard for data interchange purposes, are named "geocoding system".

There are many ways to represent the value of a cell identifier (cell-ID) of a grid: structured or monolithic, binary or not, human-readable or not. Supposing a map feature, like the Singapore's Merlion fountaine (~5m scale feature), represented by its minimum bounding cell or a center-point-cell, the cell ID will be:

Cell ID	DGG variant name and parameters	ID structure; grid resolution
(1° 17′ 13.28″ N, 103° 51′ 16.88″ E)	ISO 6709/D in degrees (Annex ), CRS = WGS84	lat(deg min sec dir) long(deg min sec dir); seconds with 2 fractionary places
(1.286795, 103.854511)	ISO 6709/F in decimal and CRS = WGS84	(lat,long); 6 fractionary places
(1.65AJ, 2V.IBCF)	ISO 6709/F in decimal in base36 (non-ISO) and CRS = WGS84	(lat,long); 4 fractionary places
w21z76281	Geohash, base32, WGS84	monolithic; 9 characters
6PH57VP3+PR	Open Location Code, base20, WGS84	monolithic; 2–8 + 0–7 digits
48N 372579 142283	UTM, standard decimal, WGS84	zone lat long; 3 + 6 + 6 digits
48N 7ZHF 31SB	UTM, coordinates base36, WGS84	zone lat long; 3 + 4 + 4 digits

All these geocodes represents the same position in the globe, with similar precision, but differ in string-length, separators-use and alphabet (non-separator characters). In some cases the "original DGG" representation can be used. The variants are minor changes, affecting only final representation, for example the base of the numeric representation, or interlacing parts of the structured into only one number or code representation. The most popular variants are used for geocoding applications.

=== Alphanumeric global grids ===
DGGs and its variants, with human-readable cell-identifiers, has been used as de facto standard for alphanumeric grids. It is not limited to alphanumeric symbols, but "alphanumeric" is the most usual term.

Geocodes are notations for locations, and in a DGG context, notations to express grid cell IDs. There are a continuous evolution in digital standards and DGGs, so a continuous change in the popularity of each geocoding convention in the last years. Broader adoption also depends on country's government adoption, use in popular mapping platforms, and many other factors.

Examples used in the following list are about "minor grid cell" containing the Washington obelisk, 38° 53′ 22.11″ N, 77° 2′ 6.88″ W.

DGG name/var	Inception and license	Summary of variant	Description and example
UTM zones/non-overlapped	1940s – CC0	original without overlapping	Divides the Earth into sixty polygonal strips. Example: 18S
Discrete UTM	1940s – CC0	original UTM integers	Divides the Earth into sixty zones, each being a six-degree band of longitude, and uses a secant transverse Mercator projection in each zone. No information about first digital use and conventions. Supposed that standardizations were later ISO's (1980s). Example: 18S 323483 4306480
ISO 6709	1983	original degree representation	The grid resolutions is a function of the number of digits — with leading zeroes filled when necessary, and fractional part with an appropriate number of digits to represent the required precision of the grid. Example: 38° 53′ 22.11″ N, 77° 2′ 6.88″ W.
ISO 6709	1983	7 decimal digits representation	Variant based in the XML representation where the data structure is a "tuple consisting of latitude and longitude represents 2-dimensional geographic position", and each number in the tuple is a real number discretized with 7 decimal places. Example: 38.889475, -77.035244.
Mapcode	2001 – Apache2	original	The first to adopt a mix code, in conjunction with ISO 3166's codes (country or city). In 2001 the algorithms were licensed Apache2, which provides a patent grant.
Geohash	2008 – CC0	original	Is like a bit-interlaced latLong, and the result is represented with base32.
Geohash-36	2011 – CC0	original	Despite the similar name, does not use the same algorithm as Geohash. Uses a 6 by 6 grid and associates a letter to each cell.
What3words	2013 patented	original (English)	converts 3×3 meter squares into 3 English-dictionary words.
Open Location Code	2014 – Apache2	original	Plus Codes, as they are known, use base-20 numbers, and can use city-names, reducing code by the size of the city's bounding box code (like Mapcode strategy). Example: 87C4VXQ7+QV.
S2 Cell ID/Base32	2015 – Apache2	original 64-bit integer expressed as base32	Hierarchical and very effective database indexing, but no standard representation for base32 and city-prefixes, as PlusCode.
What3words/otherLang	2016 ... 2017 – patented	other languages	same as English, but using other dictionary as reference for words. Portuguese example, and 10x14m cell: tenaz.fatual.davam.
fullercode	Apache-2.0	original	a subdivision of the Fuller projection into triangles.

Other documented systems:

DGG name	Inception – license	Summary	Description
C-squares	2003 – "no restriction"	Latlong interlaced	Decimal-interlacing of ISO LatLong-degree representation, with additional identifiers for intermediate quadrants. It is a "Naive" algorithm when compared with binary-interlacing or Geohash.
GEOREF	~1990 – CC0	Based on the ISO LatLong, but uses a simpler and more concise notation	"World Geographic Reference System", a military / air navigation coordinate system for point and area identification.
GARS	2007 – restricted	USA/NGA	Reference system developed by the National Geospatial-Intelligence Agency (NGA). "the standardized battlespace area reference system across DoD which will impact the entire spectrum of battlespace deconfliction"
WMO squares	2001.. – CC0?	specialized	NOAA's image download cells. ... divides a chart of the world with latitude-longitude gridlines into grid cells of 10° latitude by 10° longitude, each with a unique, 4-digit numeric identifier. 36x18 rectangular cells (labeled by four digits, the first digit identify quadrants NE/SE/SW/NW).

== See also ==
- Grid reference
- Geodesic grid
- List of geocoding systems
- Military Grid Reference System
