= Universal code =

Universal Code can refer to:

- Universal code (data compression), a prefix used to map integers onto binary codewords
- Universal Code (biology), another term for genetic code, the set of rules living cells to form proteins
- An alternate term for a Universal law, the concept that principles and rules governing human behaviour can gain legitimacy by demonstrating universal acceptability, applicability, translation, and philosophical basis of those rules
- Universal code (ethics), the belief that a system of ethics can apply to every sentient being
- Universal Product Code, a barcode symbology system widely used in Australia, Europe, New Zealand, North America, and other countries for tracking trade items
- Universal code (typography), a standard set of characters in typography
- Universal code (cartography), another term for the Natural Area Code, a geocode system for identifying a location on or in the volume of space around Earth
