= EAFR =

EAFR may refer to:

- East African coast, a Longhurst code in oceanography
- Enhanced Airborne Flight Recorder, a make of aircraft flight recorder
