= Geohash-36 =

Compression algorithm for world coordinate data

The Geohash-36 geocode is an open-source compression algorithm for world coordinate data. It was developed as a variation of the OpenPostcode format developed as a candidate geolocation postcode for the Republic of Ireland. It is calculated differently and uses a more concise base 36 representation rather than other geocodes that adopted base 32.

Despite the name, there are no algorithmic (not use Z-order curve) or typological relationship with Geohash. It is a publicity strategy to relate to a popular geocode of base 32. The encode/decode functions are not mathematically-similar to Geohash functions.

== Coding Method ==
Designed for URLs and electronic storage and communication rather than human memory and conversation, it is case-sensitive, using a 36 character alphabet: "23456789bBCdDFgGhHjJKlLMnNPqQrRtTVWX".

Character Conversion:

Decimal	0	1	2	3	4	5	6	7	8	9	10	11	12	13	14	15	16	17
Geohash-36	2	3	4	5	6	7	8	9	b	B	C	d	D	F	g	G	h	H
Decimal	18	19	20	21	22	23	24	25	26	27	28	29	30	31	32	33	34	35
Geohash-36	j	J	K	l	L	M	n	N	P	q	Q	r	R	t	T	V	W	X

Characters are chosen to avoid vowels, vowel-like numbers, character confusion, and to use lowercase characters which are generally distinct from their uppercase equivalents in standard typefaces.

The code can be of varying length and thus precision. Each character represents a further subdivision in a 6 by 6 grid - starting at the North-West (top-left) coordinate and continuing, row by row, to the South-East (bottom-right). Neighbouring coordinates have largely similar encodings and generally vary at the rightmost characters only; however extreme edge cases exist where neighbouring coordinates are on opposing sides of a grid division. Codes sort logically but not in ordinary coordinate order.

Without vowels, unintended English-language words are avoided that may appear in the original Geohash code. As vowels are not used, an altitude component of encoded meters is optional with a prefixing "A" character (below sea-level prefixed by a lowercase "a").

An optional checksum is represented using the lowercase English alphabet. It confirms the code as a Geohash-36 and provides a check for incorrect or transposed characters. It is calculated as modulus 26 of the sum of each character value (the altitude delimiters of "A" or "a" are valued at zero) multiplied by its position reading from left to right.

== Efficiency ==
Compared to storing GPS coordinates using the Decimal datatype in SQL the Geohash-36 does not save significantly on database bytes. Using DECIMAL(8,5) and DECIMAL(7,5) requires 10-bytes and is accurate to about 1.1 metre squared (or better further from the equator). An equivalent 10-bytes of the Geohash-36 code is accurate to approximately a 6th of square meter.

The Statue of Liberty, at coordinates 40.689167, −74.044444, is encoded as 9LVB4BH89g-m. The reverse decoding equates to 40.689168, −74.044445.

The Shard building, London, at coordinates 51.504444, −0.086667 is encoded as bdrdC26BqH-m (decodes to 51.504444, −0.086666), or may be successfully shorted to bdrdC26B.

== Implementations ==
=== C ===
- 'libgeohash36' – a pure C implementation of Geohash-36 algorithm.

=== Ruby ===
- 'Geohash36' – a Ruby implementation of the Geohash-36 algorithm.

== See also ==
- List of geodesic-geocoding systems
