= Global Navigation Grid Code =

Chinese global navigation point reference system

The Global Navigation Grid Code (GNGC) is a Chinese-developed point reference system designed for global navigation. It is similar in design to national grid reference systems used throughout the world. GNGC was based upon the work of the GeoSOT team, headquartered in the Institute of Remote Sensing and GIS, Peking University. The concept for this system was proposed in 2015 in Bin Li's dissertation: Navigation Computing Model of Global Navigation Grid Code. GNGC allows easy calculation of space and spatial indexes and can be extended to the provide navigation mesh coding. Along with the Beidou navigation system, GNGC provides independent intellectual property rights, globally applicable standards and global navigation trellis code.

== History ==
From 2009-2013 a research team (the Institute of Remote Sensing and GIS School of Earth and Space Science located at Peking University), in conjunction with Wuhan University, Information Engineering University, Chinese University of Science and Technology, National University of Defense Technology, completed the National 973 Project: "Global Spatial Information Subdivision Theory and Application Method". As a result of this effort, the team proposed a global subdivision grid frame: Geographic Coordinate Subdivision Grid With One Dimension Integer Coding on 2^{n} Tree (GeoSOT). This work solved the three scientific problems with regards to spatial data organization: basic frame, location code and presentation model.

This work resulted in 28 patent applications. The results of the project were published in a work entitled: Introduction to Spatial Information Subdivision.

== Design ==
GeoSOT, is a grid system that originates from a center point on Earth and climbs to another point at 50,000 km altitude. It subdivides the earth according to 32 levels into millions of grids 1 cm^{2} in size. The team proposed a complete area location coding system called "1+4 basic code, N serial extended codes". Above these codes, the global subdivision grid code is a basic one and it has been completed.

GNGC is part of research on Global Sub-division Grid (GSG, or global discrete grid, geographic grid or spatial information grid). It subdivides the Earth's surface into small cells. The research of GSG covers the methods of how to subdivide the Earth into cells of equal size and shape at different levels. GSG improves the proficiency of the spatial information presentation and data organization. GSG is one of the key methods in geo-information science.

== Applications ==
Main applications include geographic spatial data fusion, multi-source data fusion and geo-science comprehensive analysis.

It can mark location and position elements on a grid. The truing number coding design can simplify location area identification, expression and calculation.

== See also ==
- Discrete Global Grid
