= Open Location Code =

Alphanumeric encoding of geographic coordinates

Plus Codes logo

The Open Location Code (OLC) is a geocode based on a system of grids for identifying any place on the Earth. Google's Zürich engineering office developed the system and published it in October 2014. Geocodes in the OLC system are referred to as Plus Codes.

Open Location Code is a way of encoding location into a form that is easier to use than coordinates in latitude and longitude. Plus Codes are especially useful where there is no formal system to identify specific places.

Plus Codes are differently expressed latitude and longitude coordinates, so they can be assigned to any location. They are similar in length to a telephone number (e.g., 849VCWC8+R9) but can often be shortened to four or six digits when combined with a locality (e.g., CWC8+R9, Mountain View, California). Locations close to each other have similar codes. They can be encoded or decoded offline. The character set avoids similar-looking characters to reduce confusion and errors and avoids vowels to make it unlikely that a code spells existing words. Plus Codes are not case-sensitive and can therefore be easily exchanged over the phone. Since August 2015, Google Maps has supported Plus Codes in its search engine. The shortened Plus Code is displayed for a location, may be copied, clicked, or transcribed, and can be entered into the address box (followed by the town or city name if not local and using shortened code) to display the location on the map. The algorithm is licensed under the Apache License 2.0 and is available on GitHub.

== Applications ==
Plus Codes are increasingly being used for addressing purposes in places that aren't well-served by the traditional street address system. This includes the many unnamed streets in Cape Verde, multiple slums in India, and even some Native American reservations in the United States. In Laxmi Nagar, Pune, the nonprofit Shelter Associates used codes to bring delivery services to specific homes and businesses in the slum for the first time in 2020-21. Plus Codes are also being used by the International Rescue Committee in Somalia for immunization and family planning programs.

== Specification ==
The Open Location Code system is based on latitudes and longitudes in WGS84 coordinates. Each code describes an area bounded by two parallels and two meridians out of a fixed grid, identified by the southwest corner and its size. The largest grid divides the globe into blocks of 20 by 20 degrees, 18 columns from West to East and 9 rows from the South to the North poles. Those large blocks are then subdivided into 400 subblocks, 20 by 20, up to four times. Near the equator, those subblocks are square both in degrees and in meters. At midlatitudes, their angles remain square, but in terms of distance, they elongate vertically.

After the initial division and four rounds of 20x20 subdivision (via two code characters each round), further subdivisions break each block into 20 subblocks (via one code character), 4 blocks W-E by 5 blocks S-N. That leaves the subblocks wider than they are tall in terms of degrees, but at midlatitudes, this keeps them closer to square in terms of meters. The table shows the various block sizes near the equator, where the widths are maximum (listing width x height where those differ). The block widths decrease with distance from the equator.

Block sizes of Plus Codes
Code length	2	4	6	8	+	10	11	12	13	14	15
Block size	20°	1°	0.05° (3′)	0.0025° (9″)		0.000125° (0.45″)	0.1125″	0.0281″	0.0070″	0.0018″	0.0004″
Real size	2,200 km	110 km	5.6 km	280 m		14 m	3.5 m × 2.8 m	0.8 m × 0.5 m	20 cm × 10 cm	5 cm × 2 cm	14 mm × 4 mm

The full grid uses offsets from the South Pole (−90°) and the antimeridian (−180°) expressed in base 20 representation. To avoid misreading or spelling objectionable words, the encoding excludes vowels and symbols that may be easily confused with each other. The following table shows the mapping.

Mapping of Plus Codes
Base 10 digit	0	1	2	3	4	5	6	7	8	9	10	11	12	13	14	15	16	17	18	19
Base 20 digit	0	1	2	3	4	5	6	7	8	9	A	B	C	D	E	F	G	H	I	J
Code digit	2	3	4	5	6	7	8	9	C	F	G	H	J	M	P	Q	R	V	W	X

The code begins with up to five pairs of digits, each consisting of one digit representing latitude and one representing longitude. After eight digits, a plus sign "+" is inserted in the code as a delimiter to aid with visual parsing. After a final pair immediately following the "+" delimiter, any subblocks thereafter are coded in a single code digit as follows:

Division of subblocks in Plus Codes
	longitude →			
latitude →	R	V	W	X
latitude →	J	M	P	Q
latitude →	C	F	G	H
latitude →	6	7	8	9
latitude →	2	3	4	5

Areas larger than an 8-digit block can be specified by truncating the code after the relevant digit pairs and inserting the "padding character" 0 (zero) before the + sign, with nothing following it.

== Example ==
Consider, for example, zooming in on the Merlion fountain (1.286785°N 103.854503°E) in Singapore, which has Plus Code 6PH57VP3+PR6,7VP3+PR6 Singapore, or 7VP3+PR6 if in Singapore. It lies in the block around the equator bounded by −10° South and +10° North, and between 100° and 120° East. It has offsets 80° from the South Pole, and 280° from the anti-meridian; or, 4 (=80/20) and 14 (=280/20) as the first base-20 digits, coded as "6" and "P". Thus, the code is "6P". This may be padded as 6P000000+.

Now, refine this block to a subblock between 1° and 2° N and 103° and 104° E. This adds 11° and 3° to the SW corner. So the base-20 coordinate codes added are "H" and "5". The result is padded to 6PH50000+.

After four further refinements, one lands on Merlion Park as 6PH57VP3+PR.

The next step requires dividing the square so far used, to refine the position into a 4-by-5 grid, and finding the cell to which the coordinates are pointing. This is the cell named "6".

=== BASE20 Formula ===
Alternatively, use formula BASE(Degrees from South or West * power(20, 4) , 20) in any Spreadsheet or Calculator to compute the Plus Code. For the coordinates 1.286785°N 103.854503°E from the previous example:

- 1.286785N = 91.286785 from South Pole, in Base20 = 4B.5EE(5) in alphanumeric = which is 6H.7PP in OLC digits.
- 103.854503E = 283.854503 from Anti-Meridian, in Base20 = E3.H1G(0) in alphanumeric = which is P5.V3R in OLC digits.
- Combining latitude and longitude alternatively, 6P H5 7V P3 PR.
- The last leftover in Base20, (5)/20 latitude and (0)/20 longitude gives 6 in the 4-by-5 grid.

Therefore, the resulting Plus Code is 6PH57VP3+PR6.

== Common usage and shortening ==
It is common to omit the first four characters from the code and add an approximate location, such as a city, state, or country. The above example then becomes 7VP3+PR6 Singapore. This is supported by the Google Maps app and the plus.codes website, and also by non-Google apps. These short forms of Plus Codes can be used in lieu of a house number in a neighborhood.

Shortened codes cannot be unambiguously encoded or decoded without context. The specification does not rely on any specific database of contextual reference location place names and their exact locations, but there are a variety of geocoding databases which map names to latitude and longitude. Disambiguation requires narrowing the possibilities to within about 40 km of the referenced location. The coordinates of the user's current location can be also used for context, if applicable.

Comparison
Ex.	Plus Codes	Valid digits	Shortened codes	Precision	Point of interest	Street address	Lat/long of centroid
1	87C4VXQ7+QV	10	VXQ7+QV, Washington, District of Columbia, USA	6 digits (14 m)	Washington Monument	2 15th St NW, Washington, DC 20024, United States	38.889437, −77.035313
2	9C3XGV3C+8X	10	GV3C+8X, London, United Kingdom	6 digits (14 m)	10 Downing Street	10 Downing St, London SW1A 2AA, United Kingdom	51.503312, −0.127562
3	7GHXG559+4VQ	11	G559+4VQ, Al-Baghdadiyah Al-Gharbiyah, Jeddah, Saudi Arabia	7 digits (3.5 m)	Jeddah Flagpole	King Abdullah Bin Abdulaziz Square, Al-Baghdadiyah Al-Gharbiyah, Jeddah 22231, Saudi Arabia	21.507813, 39.169688
4	8FWMQRCQ+JRV	11	QRCQ+JRV, Schwarzenberg am Böhmerwald, Austria	7 digits (3.5 m)	Tri-Border Czechia/Austria/Germany	Tri-Border, 4164 Schwarzenberg am Böhmerwald, Austria	48.771613, 13.839547
5	8Q7XMP52+J7CC	12	MP52+J7CC, Shibuya, Tokyo, Japan	8 digits (87 cm)	Hachikō Memorial Statue	2 Chome-1 Dogenzaka, Shibuya, Tokyo 150-0043, Japan	35.659063, 139.700688
6	37QH5M6Q+54X3X	13	5M6Q+54XYX, Ushuaia, Tierra del Fuego Province, Argentina	9 digits (22 cm)	—	—	−54.83952050, −68.31214160
7	6G8RJMMW+9V9V9V	14	JMMW+9V9V9V, Arusha, Tanzania	10 digits (5 cm)	—	—	−3.36657810, 36.69723315
8	6P58QRJ3+H25FGFG	15	QRJ3+H25FGFG, Jakarta, Indonesia	11 digits (14 mm)	—	—	−6.21861250, 106.80260626

== See also ==
- Geocode – Code that represents a geographic entity (location or object)
  - Geohash – Public domain geocoding invented in 2008
  - Mapcode – Open-source geocode system
  - Maidenhead Locator System – Geocode system used by radio amateurs
  - What3Words – Proprietary geocoding system
- Advanced Mobile Location – Widely implemented caller location for emergency services
- Geographic coordinate system – System to specify locations on Earth
  - Projected coordinate system – Cartesian geographic coordinate system
  - Universal Transverse Mercator coordinate system – Map projection system
