= Natural Area Code =

Geocode system for identifying an area anywhere on the Earth

Natural Area Code, also called Universal Address, is a geocode generated by the Natural Area Coding System - a public domain geocode system for identifying an area (also a location when the area is relatively small enough) anywhere on the Earth, or a volume of space anywhere around and inside the Earth. The use of thirty alphanumeric characters instead of only ten digits makes a NAC shorter than its numerical latitude/longitude equivalent.

== Two-dimensional system ==
Instead of numerical longitudes and latitudes, a grid with 30 rows and 30 columns - each cell denoted by the numbers 0-9 and the twenty consonants of the Latin alphabet - is laid over the flattened globe. A NAC cell (or block) can be subdivided repeatedly into smaller NAC grids to yield an arbitrarily small area, subject to the ±1 m limitations of the World Geodetic System (WGS) data of 1984.

A NAC represents an area on the Earth—the longer the NAC, the smaller the area (and thereby, location) represented. A ten-character NAC can uniquely specify any building, house, or fixed object in the world. An eight-character NAC specifies an area no larger than 25 metres by 50 metres, while a ten-character NAC cell is no larger than 0.8 metres by 1.6 metres.

Using a base 30 positional numeral system, NAC uses an alternate method which excludes vowels and avoids potential confusion between "0" (zero) and "O" (capital "o"), and "1" (one) and "I" (capital "i"):

Decimal	0	1	2	3	4	5	6	7	8	9	10	11	12	13	14
Base 30	0	1	2	3	4	5	6	7	8	9	B	C	D	F	G
Decimal	15	16	17	18	19	20	21	22	23	24	25	26	27	28	29
Base 30	H	J	K	L	M	N	P	Q	R	S	T	V	W	X	Z

For example, the ten-character NAC for the centre of the city of Brussels is HBV6R RG77T.

== Extension to three dimensions ==
The full NAC system provides a third coordinate: altitude. This coordinate is the arctangent of the altitude, relative to the Earth's radius, and scaled so that the zero point (000...) is at the centre of the Earth, the midpoint (H00...) is the local radius of the geoid, i.e. the Earth's surface, and the endpoint (ZZZ...) is at infinity.

For example, the three-dimensional NAC for the centre of Brussels, at ground level, is HBV6R RG77T H0000.

== See also ==
- Geocode
- Military Grid Reference System
- Universal Transverse Mercator coordinate system
- Quadtree
- Geohash
