= Alphanumeric grid =

	a	b	c	d	e	f
1	a1	b1	c1	d1	e1	f1
2	a2	b2	c2	d2	e2	f2
3	a3	b3	c3	d3	e3	f3
4	a4	b4	c4	d4	e4	f4
5	a5	b5	c5	d5	e5	f5
6	a6	b6	c6	d6	e6	f6

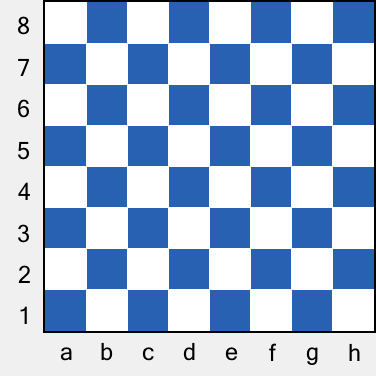
Example of an Alphanumeric board

An alphanumeric grid (also known as atlas grid) is a simple coordinate system on a grid in which each cell is identified by a combination of a letter and a number.

An advantage over numeric coordinates such as easting and northing, which use two numbers instead of a number and a letter to refer to a grid cell, is that there can be no confusion over which coordinate refers to which direction. As an easy example, one could think about battleship; simply match the number at the top to the number on the bottom, then follow the two lines until they meet in a spot.

Algebraic chess notation uses an alphanumeric grid to refer to the squares of a chessboard.

Some kinds of geocode also use letters and numbers, typically several of each in order to specify many more locations over much larger regions.
