= Advanced Mobile Location =

Widely implemented caller location for emergency services

Advanced Mobile Location (AML) is a free-of-charge emergency location-based service (LBS) available on smartphones that, when a caller dials the local (in country) short dial emergency telephone number, sends the best available geolocation of the caller to a dedicated end-point, usually a Public Safety Answering Point, making the location of the caller available to emergency call takers in real-time. AML improves the time taken by emergency call takers to verify the location of callers and can improve the time taken to dispatch an emergency response.

AML is a protocol to transport data with SMS and/or HTTPS from the phone to the emergency call centre in all countries that have deployed AML; it is not an app and does not require any action from the caller. AML is supported in many countries, and by all smartphones running recent versions of Android or iOS. It can be disabled in user settings on Android but it is always available on iOS.

AML was standardised by the European Telecommunications Standards Institute (ETSI) Emergency Telecommunications Subcommittee (EMTEL) in 2019 as Technical Specifications.

== History ==
AML was developed in the United Kingdom in 2014 by British Telecom, EE Limited, and HTC as a solution to problematic caller location in emergencies. When a person in distress calls the emergency services with a smartphone where AML is enabled, the telephone automatically activates its location service to establish its position and sends this information to the emergency services via an SMS. The services use either a global navigation satellite system or WiFi depending on which one is better at the given moment. It was estimated that this technique is up to 4000 times more accurate than the previously used system.

== Mobile phone support ==
=== Supported operating systems ===
Google announced in July 2016 that all Android phones running version 2.3.7, Gingerbread (released in December 2010) or later include AML. Google calls their implementation Emergency Location Service (ELS) or Android Emergency Location Service (AELS); this needs to be enabled in phone settings.

Apple devices, since March 2018, running iOS 11.3 or later support AML.

=== Regional requirements ===
From March 2022 all smartphones sold in the EU Single Market must be equipped with AML, following a delegated regulation supplementing the Radio Equipment Directive.

== Geographical availability ==
As of October 2024 AML was deployed in:

Country	Region	Operating System	Note
Australia	Oceania		
Austria	Europe	Android only	Not all local emergency numbers supported; 112 supported
Belgium	Europe		112, 1722, 1733 supported
Brazil	South America	Android, iOS	190 (Police), 192 (SAMU) and 193 (Fire) supported
Bulgaria	Europe		
Croatia	Europe		
Czechia	Europe	Android, iOS	Wi-Fi supported
Denmark	Europe		
Estonia	Europe	Android, iOS, HarmonyOS, Jolla	
France	Europe		
Finland	Europe		
Germany	Europe		112 supported, 110 (Police) only some federal states only
Greece	Europe		
Hungary	Europe		
Iceland	Europe		
Ireland	Europe		
Latvia	Europe	Android, iOS	
Lithuania	Europe		
Malaysia	Asia	Android, iOS	Next Generation Emergency Response Services 999 (NG MERS 999) Wireless carrier support and features for iPhone in Asia-Pacific
Mexico	North America	Android only	Some PSAPs
Moldova	Europe		
Montenegro	Europe	Android only	
Netherlands	Europe	Android, iOS, HarmonyOS	
North Macedonia	Europe		
New Zealand	Oceania	Android, iOS	Known as Emergency Caller Location Information
Norway	Europe		
Philippines	Asia	Android	Only Android was mentioned. iOS and other operating systems were not mentioned. Not all local emergency numbers supported; 911 supported.
Portugal	Europe		
Romania	Europe	Android, iOS, HarmonyOS	
Slovakia	Europe	Android, iOS, HarmonyOS	
Slovenia	Europe		
Spain	Europe		
Sweden	Europe		
Switzerland	Europe	Android, iOS, HarmonyOS	
United Arab Emirates	Asia	Android, iOS	Not all local emergency numbers supported. 999 and 998 are enabled for Android. Only 999 is enabled on iOS.
United Kingdom	Europe	Android, iOS	999, 112
United States	North America		Some PSAPs
(PSAPs) - Public Safety Answering Points

The European Electronic Communications Code mandates that all EU states were required to implement AML by December 2020.

AML also works when using emergency SMS service on Android phones in some countries.

== Functionality ==
If a device's location services and Wi-Fi are not active, AML temporarily turns them on. It collects and computes location data, sends a message containing the caller's location, usually by SMS, to the emergency services, then returns location services and Wi-Fi to their previous state.

The service can also send the data via an HTTPS POST request to the specified endpoint. The country implementing AML decides whether to use an SMS or an HTTPS endpoint, or both.

== Alternatives ==
Alternative ways of specifying and communicating location have been developed, such as What3words and Google's Open Location Code ("Plus Code"), but these require the caller's active participation, which may not be realistic for an injured caller.

== See also ==
- Computer Aided Dispatch – Method of dispatching vehicle-based services, especially emergency services
