= What3words =

Proprietary geocoding system

What3words Limited

- Part of the What3Words grid on the Palace of Westminster showing typical words and their pseudorandom distribution
- Trade name: what3words
- Founded: March 5, 2013; 13 years ago in Royston, Hertfordshire, England
- Founders: Chris Sheldrick; Jack Waley-Cohen; Mohan Ganesalingam; Michael Dent
- Headquarters: London, England, UK
- Revenue: ▲£2.2M; (2024)
- Operating income: ▲ −£14.1M; (2024)
- Net income: ▲ −£10.6M; (2024)
- Number of employees: 87 (2024)
- Website: what3words.com

What3words (stylized as what3words) is a proprietary geocode system designed to identify any location on the surface of Earth with a resolution of approximately 3 metres (9.8 ft). It is owned by What3words Limited, based in London, England. The system encodes geographic coordinates into three permanently fixed dictionary words. For example, the front door of 10 Downing Street in London is identified by ///slurs.this.shark.

What3words differs from most location encoding systems in that it uses words rather than strings of numbers or letters, and the pattern of this mapping is not obvious; the algorithm mapping locations to words is copyrighted.

What3words has been subject to a number of criticisms both for its closed source code and the significant risk of ambiguity and confusion in its three word addresses. This has led rescuers to advise against the use of What3words in safety critical applications.

The company has a website, apps for iOS and Android, and an API for bidirectional conversion between What3words addresses and latitude–longitude coordinates.

== History ==
Founded by Chris Sheldrick, Jack Waley-Cohen, Mohan Ganesalingam and Michael Dent, What3words was launched in July 2013. Sheldrick and Ganesalingam conceived the idea when Sheldrick, working as an event organizer, struggled to get bands and equipment to the appropriate loading docks and entrances of large music venues. Sheldrick tried using GPS coordinates, but decided that words were better than numbers after transposing two digits led a driver to the wrong location. He credits a mathematician friend for the idea of dividing the world into 3-metre (10 ft) squares, and the linguist Jack Waley-Cohen with using memorable words. The company was incorporated in March 2013 and a patent application for the core technology filed in April 2013. In November 2013, What3words raised US$500,000 of seed funding.

What3words originally sold "OneWord" addresses, which were stored in a database for a yearly fee, but this offering was discontinued as the company switched to a business-to-business model. In 2015, the company was targeting logistics companies, post offices, and couriers.

In January 2018, Mercedes-Benz bought approximately 10% of the company and announced support for What3words in future versions of their infotainment and navigation system.

In March 2021, it was announced that ITV plc had invested £2 million in What3words as the first investment in its media-for-equity scheme.

What3words has raised more than £50m from investors since launching. In 2024, what3words had a turnover of £2.2m and made a loss of £10.6m.

== Source of revenue ==
The what3words system and app is free for anyone to use. The company states that its revenue comes from charging businesses that benefit from its products.

== Design ==
=== Wordlists ===
What3words divides the world into a grid of 57 trillion 3-by-3-metre (10 ft × 10 ft) squares, each of which has a three-word address. The company says it does its best to remove homophones and spelling variations; however, at least 32 pairs of English near-homophones still remain.

Wordlists are available in 60 languages, each of which uses a list of 25,000 words (except for English, which uses 40,000 to cover sea as well as land). Translations are not direct, as direct translations to some languages could produce more than three words. Rather, territories are localised "considering linguistic sensitivities and nuances". Densely populated areas have strings of short words to aid more frequent usage; while less populated areas, such as the North Atlantic, use more complex words.

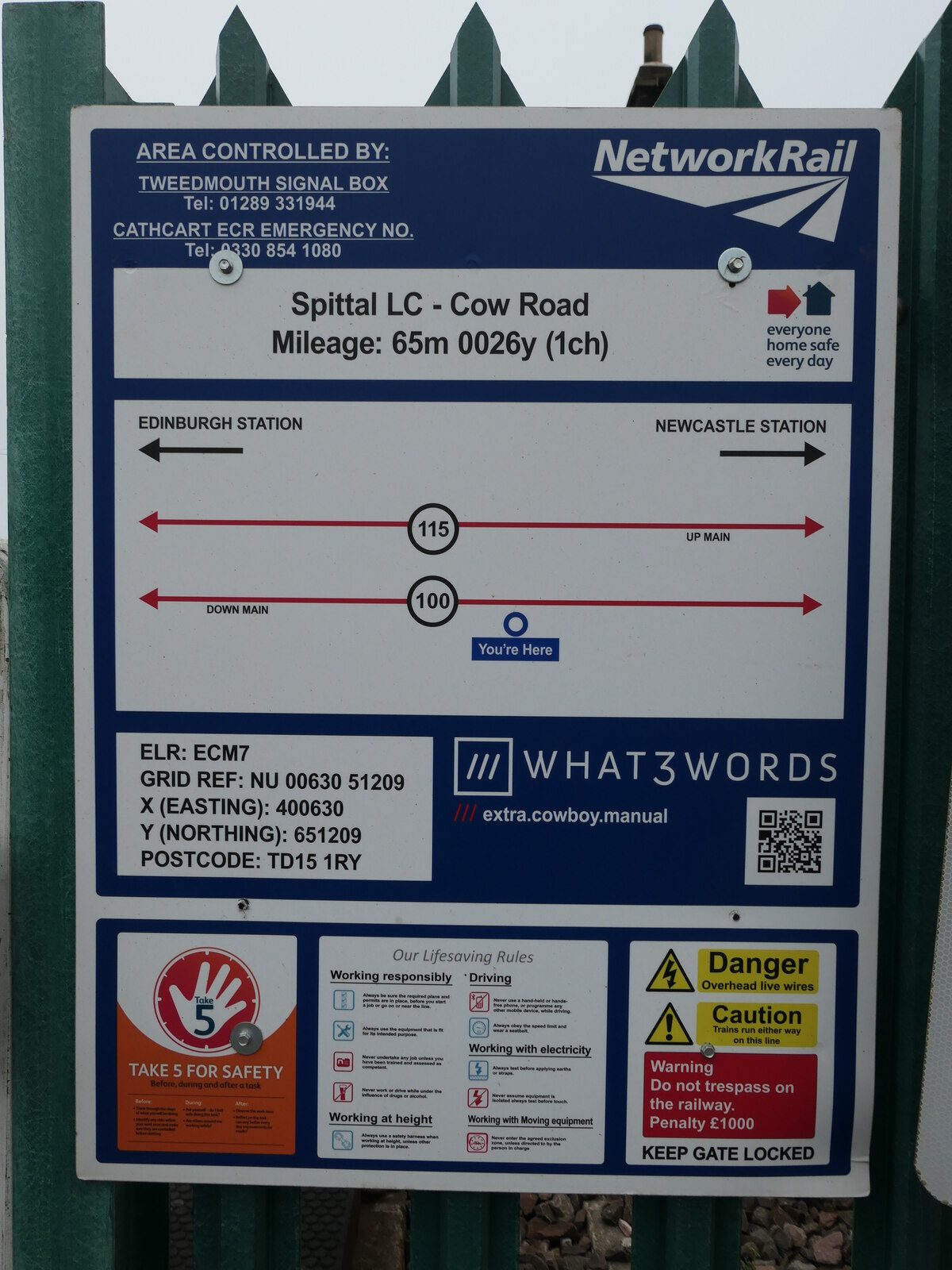
what3words reference on a sign in Northumberland

In a 2019 blog, open standards advocate and technology expert Terence Eden questioned the cultural neutrality of using words rather than the numbers generated by map coordinates. "Numbers are (mostly) culturally neutral," he said, "words are not. Is mile.crazy.shade a respectful name for a war memorial? How about tribes.hurt.stumpy for a temple?"

=== Ambiguity ===
What3words state that similar addresses are spaced as far apart as possible to avoid confusion, and that similarly sounding codes have a 1 in 2.5 million chance of pointing to locations near each other.

However, security researcher Andrew Tierney calculates that 75% of What3words addresses contain plural words that also exist in singular form (or the reverse). Co-founder and CEO Sheldrick responded that "Whilst the overwhelming proportion of similar-sounding three-word combinations will be so far apart that an error is obvious, there will still be cases where similar sounding word combinations are nearby." Further analysis by Tierney shows that in the London area, around 1 in 24 addresses will be confusable with another London address.

In September 2022, the Department for Culture, Media and Sport used What3words to direct mourners to the end of the queue to view the Queen lying in state in London. Of the first five codes published, four led to the wrong place, including a suburb of London some 15 miles (24 km) from the real end of the queue. Officials later moved to an automated system to generate the identifiers, as they realised having people involved in the process resulted in typos.

A paper published in 2023 investigated the patented algorithm without using What3words's own wordlist. It found that using linear congruence for address assignment does a poor job of randomising the wordlist. It also noted that the AutoSuggest feature did not return sufficient results to disambiguate an address. It concluded that "W3W should not be adopted as critical infrastructure without a thorough evaluation against a number of competing alternatives".

== Reception ==
According to Rory Sutherland from the advertising agency Ogilvy in a 2014 op-ed piece for The Spectator, the system's advantages are memorability, accuracy, and non-ambiguity in speech.

=== Mountain rescue ===
Mountain rescue services in the UK have warned against relying on the app:

- In December 2019, the Lake District Search & Mountain Rescue Association noted that "mishearing or misspelling words tended to cause problems" and warned hikers not to rely on it.
- In June 2021, Mountain Rescue England and Wales raised concerns about the credibility of reported What3words coordinates, following incorrect information being given about 45 locations over 12 months. Spelling issues and local accents were reported as being part of the problem.
- In August 2022, the Keswick Mountain Rescue Team described a rescue where the "W3W location has been close enough to be believable but wrong enough to be useless"
- In December 2023, mountain rescue teams from Wiltshire and the Durham Dales warned that the app led them to locations 8 and 10 km (5 and 6 mi) away from the correct spots.

=== Other emergency services ===
Since 2019, What3words has seen adoption by police, fire and ambulance services, who can use it for free and participate in media campaigns provided by What3Words to promote the app. By September 2021, more than 85 percent of British emergency services teams used What3words, including the Metropolitan Police and London Fire Brigade. Support has also been added to the Australian Government's Triple Zero Emergency Plus App.

Success stories typically report using the app to communicate between rescue teams:

- In September 2019, the Scottish Ambulance Service used the app to share the location of an injured hillwalker with the coastguard.
- In February 2020, Ambulance Tasmania sent a link to locate an injured bushwalker.
- In October 2020, the Singapore Police Force asked two lost 14-year-old boys to download and use the app.
- In July 2022, Baldwin County, Alabama dispatchers used the app to pinpoint a capsized kayaker, with responders saying that they "were within 50 yards (45 m) and couldn't see him because of the conditions in the water".
- In August 2022, Tröstau Fire Brigade used the app to communicate a location to the Wunsiedel mountain rescue service.
- In September 2022, Halton emergency services in Canada located an injured climber using the app.
- In August 2022, East of England Ambulance Service took "nearly 10 minutes" to identify a cycle path after being given a What3words address. When approached by Cambridge News, the Ambulance Service continued to recommend the app, and did not respond to a query about why they were unable to quickly pinpoint the precise location using the system.
- In October 2025, first responders co-ordinated reaching an injured hunter outside of Ridgeway, Wisconsin using the app.

=== Proprietary ===
The What3words system has been criticised for being controlled by a private business, and the software for being patented and not freely usable.

The company has pursued a policy of issuing copyright claims against individuals and organisations that have hosted or published files of the What3words algorithm or reverse-engineered code that replicates the service's functionality, such as the free and open source implementation WhatFreeWords; the whatfreewords.org website was taken down following a Digital Millennium Copyright Act (DMCA) take-down notice issued by What3words. This policy has extended to removing comments on social media which refer to unauthorised versions. In late April 2021, a security researcher who had offered on Twitter to share WhatFreeWords software was contacted by What3Words's law firm, requiring him to delete the tweets and the software, and implying that legal action might follow non-compliance.

=== Parody ===
The site has been parodied by others who have created services including What3Emojis using emojis, What3Birds using British birds, What3fucks using swear words, Four King Maps also using swear words (covering only the British Isles), and What3Numbers using OpenStreetMap tile identifiers.

=== Awards ===
- Grand Prix for Innovation at the 2015 Cannes Lions International Festival of Creativity
- The Tech Awards 2015 Sobrato Organization Economic Development Award

== See also ==
- Geocode – Code that represents a geographic entity (location or object)
  - Geohash – Public domain geocoding invented in 2008
  - Mapcode – Open-source geocode system
  - Maidenhead Locator System – Geocode system used by radio amateurs
  - Open Location Code – Alphanumeric encoding of geographic coordinates ("PlusCode")
- Advanced Mobile Location – Widely implemented caller location for emergency services
- Geographic coordinate system – System to specify locations on Earth
  - Projected coordinate system – Cartesian geographic coordinate system
  - Universal Transverse Mercator coordinate system – Map projection system
