= Longhurst code =

Geocode system for world ocean geographic regions

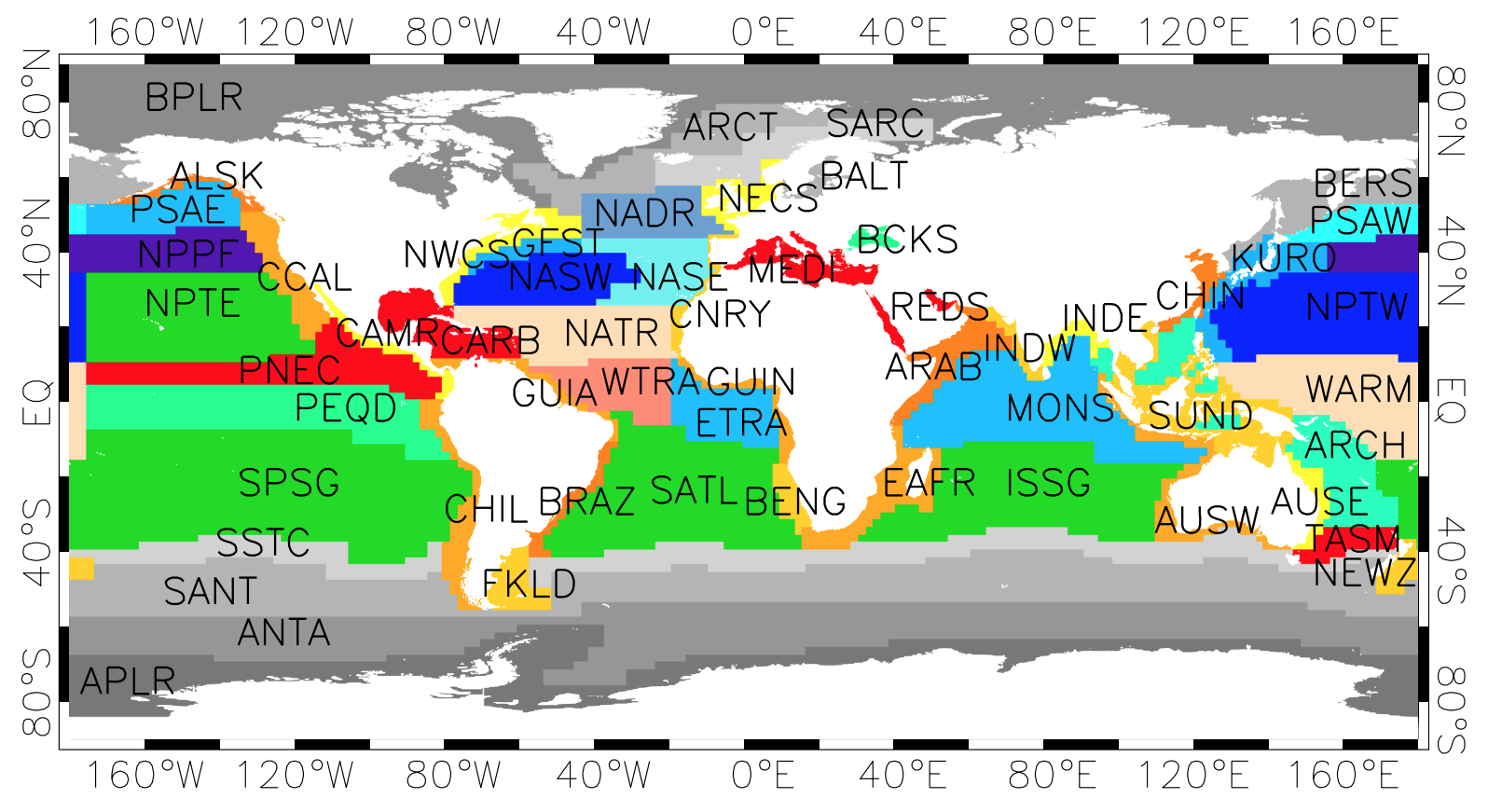
Modified Longhurst biogeographic provinces from Djavidnia et al.

Longhurst code refers to a set of geospatial four-letter geocodes for referencing geographic regions in oceanography.

The set of 56 geocodes represent biogeochemical provinces that partition the pelagic environment. It is assumed that each province represents a unique set of environmental conditions.

They are named after Alan R. Longhurst, the author of "Ecological Geography of the Sea", the textbook in which these codes are defined.

These codes have also been used in bioinformatic databases such as IMG to represent sample origins for sequenced microbial genomes, as a supplement to latitude and longitude coordinate metrics.

longhurst_code	province_name	ocean	biome
FKLD	Southwest Atlantic shelves	Atlantic	Coastal
BRAZ	Brazilian current coast	Atlantic	Coastal
BENG	Benguela current coast	Atlantic	Coastal
GUIN	Guinea current coast	Atlantic	Coastal
CNRY	Canary current coast	Atlantic	Coastal
GUIA	Guianas coast	Atlantic	Coastal
NECS	Northeast Atlantic shelves	Atlantic	Coastal
NWCS	Northwest Atlantic shelves	Atlantic	Coastal
ARCT	Atlantic Arctic	Atlantic	Polar
SARC	Atlantic sub-Arctic	Atlantic	Polar
SATL	South Atlantic gyral	Atlantic	Trade wind
ETRA	Eastern tropical Atlantic	Atlantic	Trade wind
WTRA	Western tropical Atlantic	Atlantic	Trade wind
CARB	Caribbean	Atlantic	Trade wind
NATR	North Atlantic tropical gyral	Atlantic	Trade wind
NAST E	Northeast Atlantic subtropical gyral	Atlantic	Westerly
MEDI	Mediterranean Sea	Atlantic	Westerly
NAST W	Northwest Atlantic subtropical gyral	Atlantic	Westerly
GFST	Gulf Stream	Atlantic	Westerly
NADR	North Atlantic Drift	Atlantic	Westerly
HUMB	Humboldt current coast	Pacific	Coastal
AUSE	East Australian coast	Pacific	Coastal
SUND	Sunda-Arafura shelves	Pacific	Coastal
CHIN	China Sea	Pacific	Coastal
CAMR	Central American coast	Pacific	Coastal
ALSK	Alaska coastal downwelling	Pacific	Coastal
NEWZ	New Zealand coast	Pacific	Coastal
CCAL	Coastal Californian current	Pacific	Coastal
BERS	North Pacific epicontinental sea	Pacific	Polar
ARCH	Archipelagic deep basins	Pacific	Trade wind
PEQD	Pacific equatorial divergence	Pacific	Trade wind
PNEC	North Pacific equatorial counter current	Pacific	Trade wind
NPTG	North Pacific Tropical gyre	Pacific	Trade wind
C(O)CAL	California current	Pacific	Trade wind
SPSG	South Pacific gyre	Pacific	Trade wind
WARM	Western Pacific warm pool	Pacific	Trade wind
TASM	Tasman Sea	Pacific	Westerly
KURO	Kuroshio current	Pacific	Westerly
PSAE	Eastern Pacific subarctic gyres	Pacific	Westerly
PSAW	Western Pacific subarctic gyres	Pacific	Westerly
NPPF	North Pacific polar front	Pacific	Westerly
NPSW	Northwest Pacific subtropical	Pacific	Westerly
NPSE	Northeast Pacific subtropical	Pacific	Westerly
EAFR	East African coast	Indian	Coastal
AUSW	Western Australian and Indonesian coast	Indian	Coastal
IND E	Eastern India coast	Indian	Coastal
REDS	Red Sea, Persian Gulf	Indian	Coastal
IND W	Western India coast	Indian	Coastal
ISSG	Indian South subtropical gyre	Indian	Trade wind
MONS	Indian monsoon gyre	Indian	Trade wind
ARAB	Northwest Arabian Sea upwelling	Indian	Westerly
SSTC	South subtropical convergence	Antarctic	Westerly
SANT	Subantarctic water ring	Antarctic	Westerly
ANTA	Antarctic	Antarctic	Polar
APLR	Austral polar	Antarctic	Polar
BPLR	Boreal polar	Arctic	Polar
