= Geographic coordinate system =

System to specify locations on Earth

Longitude lines are perpendicular to, and latitude lines parallel to, the Equator

A geographic coordinate system (GCS) is a spherical or geodetic coordinate system for measuring and communicating positions directly on Earth as latitude and longitude. It is the simplest, oldest, and most widely used type of the various spatial reference systems that are in use, and forms the basis for most others. Although latitude and longitude form a coordinate pair like a Cartesian coordinate system, geographic coordinate systems are not Cartesian because the measurements are angles and are not on a planar surface.

A full GCS specification, such as those listed in the EPSG and ISO 19111 standards, also includes a choice of geodetic datum (including an Earth ellipsoid), as different datums will yield different latitude and longitude values for the same location.

== History ==
The invention of a geographic coordinate system is generally credited to Eratosthenes of Cyrene, who composed his now-lost Geography at the Library of Alexandria in the 3rd century BC. A century later, Hipparchus of Nicaea improved on this system by determining latitude from stellar measurements rather than solar altitude and determining longitude by timings of lunar eclipses, rather than dead reckoning. In the 1st or 2nd century, Marinus of Tyre compiled an extensive gazetteer and mathematically plotted world map using coordinates measured east from a prime meridian at the westernmost known land, designated the Fortunate Isles, off the coast of western Africa around the Canary or Cape Verde Islands, and measured north or south of the island of Rhodes off Asia Minor. Ptolemy credited him with the full adoption of longitude and latitude, rather than measuring latitude in terms of the length of the midsummer day.

Ptolemy's 2nd-century Geography used the same prime meridian but measured latitude from the Equator instead. After their work was translated into Arabic in the 9th century, Al-Khwārizmī's Book of the Description of the Earth corrected Marinus' and Ptolemy's errors regarding the length of the Mediterranean Sea, (Note: The pair had accurate absolute distances within the Mediterranean but underestimated the circumference of the Earth, causing their degree measurements to overstate its length west from Rhodes or Alexandria, respectively.) causing medieval Arabic cartography to use a prime meridian around 10° east of Ptolemy's line. Mathematical cartography resumed in Europe following Maximus Planudes' recovery of Ptolemy's text a little before 1300; the text was translated into Latin at Florence by Jacopo d'Angelo around 1407.

In 1884, the United States hosted the International Meridian Conference, attended by representatives from twenty-five nations. Twenty-two of them agreed to adopt the longitude of the Royal Observatory in Greenwich, England as the zero-reference line. The Dominican Republic voted against the motion, while France and Brazil abstained. France adopted Greenwich Mean Time in place of local determinations by the Paris Observatory in 1911.

== Latitude and longitude ==
Diagram of the latitude ϕ and longitude λ angle measurements for a spherical model of the Earth

The latitude φ of a point on Earth's surface is defined in one of three ways, depending on the type of coordinate system. In each case, the latitude is the angle formed by the plane of the equator and a line formed by the point on the surface and a second point on equatorial plane. What varies between the types of coordinate systems is how the point on the equatorial plane is determined:

- In an astronomical coordinate system, the second point is found where the extension of the plumb bob vertical from the surface point intersects the equatorial plane.
- In a geodetic coordinate system, the second point is found where the normal vector from the surface of the ellipsoid at the surface point intersects the equatorial plane.
- In a geocentric coordinate system, the second point is the center of Earth.

The path that joins all points of the same latitude traces a circle on the surface of Earth, as viewed from above the north or south pole, called parallels, as they are parallel to the equator and to each other. The north pole is 90° N; the south pole is 90° S. The 0° parallel of latitude is defined to be the equator, the fundamental plane of a geographic coordinate system. The equator divides the globe into Northern and Southern Hemispheres.

The longitude λ of a point on Earth's surface is the angle east or west of a reference meridian to another meridian that passes through that point. All meridians are halves of great ellipses, which converge at the North and South Poles. The meridian of the British Royal Observatory in Greenwich, in southeast London, England, is the international prime meridian, although some organizations—such as the French Institut national de l'information géographique et forestière—continue to use other meridians for internal purposes. The antipodal meridian of Greenwich is both 180°W and 180°E. This is not to be conflated with the International Date Line, which partly overlaps with the 180° meridian but diverges from it in several places for political and convenience reasons, including between far eastern Russia and the far western Aleutian Islands.

The combination of these two components specifies the position of any location on the surface of Earth, without consideration of altitude or depth. The visual grid on a map formed by lines of latitude and longitude is known as a graticule. The origin/zero point of this system is located in the Gulf of Guinea about 625 km (390 mi) south of Tema, Ghana, a location often facetiously called Null Island.

== Geodetic datum ==
In order to use the theoretical definitions of latitude, longitude, and height to precisely measure actual locations on the physical earth, a geodetic datum must be used. A horizonal datum is used to precisely measure latitude and longitude, while a vertical datum is used to measure elevation or altitude. Both types of datum bind a mathematical model of the shape of the earth (usually a reference ellipsoid for a horizontal datum, and a more precise geoid for a vertical datum) to the earth. Traditionally, this binding was created by a network of control points, surveyed locations at which monuments are installed, and were only accurate for a region of the surface of the Earth. Newer datums are based on a global network for satellite measurements (GNSS, VLBI, SLR and DORIS).

This combination of a mathematical model and physical binding ensures that users of the same datum obtain identical coordinates for a given physical point. However, different datums typically produce different coordinates for the same location (sometimes deviating several hundred meters) not due to actual movement, but because the reference system itself is shifted. Because any spatial reference system or map projection is ultimately calculated from latitude and longitude, it is crucial that they clearly state the datum on which they are based. For example, a UTM coordinate based on a WGS84 realisation will be different than a UTM coordinate based on NAD27 for the same location. Transforming coordinates from one datum to another requires a datum transformation method such as a Helmert transformation, although in certain situations a simple translation may be sufficient.

Datums may be global, meaning that they represent the whole Earth, or they may be regional, meaning that they represent an ellipsoid best-fit to only a portion of the Earth. Examples of global datums include the several realizations of WGS 84 (with the 2D datum ensemble EPSG:4326 with 2 meter accuracy as identifier) used for the Global Positioning System, (Note: WGS 84 is the default datum used in most GPS equipment, but other datums and map projections can be selected.) and the several realizations of the International Terrestrial Reference System and Frame (such as ITRF2020 with subcentimeter accuracy), which takes into account continental drift and crustal deformation.

Datums with a regional fit of the ellipsoid that are chosen by a national cartographical organization include the North American Datums, the European ED50, and the British OSGB36. Given a location, the datum provides the latitude $\phi$ and longitude $\lambda$. In the United Kingdom there are three common latitude, longitude, and height systems in use. WGS 84 differs at Greenwich from the one used on published maps OSGB36 by approximately 112 m. ED50 differs from about 120 m to 180 m.

Points on the Earth's surface move relative to each other due to continental plate motion, subsidence, and diurnal Earth tidal movement caused by the Moon and the Sun. This daily movement can be as much as a meter. Continental movement can be up to 10 cm a year, or 10 m in a century. A weather system high-pressure area can cause a sinking of 5 mm. Scandinavia is rising by 1 cm a year as a result of the melting of the ice sheets of the last ice age, but neighboring Scotland is rising by only 0.2 cm. These changes are insignificant if a regional datum is used, but are statistically significant if a global datum is used.

== Length of a degree ==
On the GRS 80 or WGS 84 spheroid at sea level at the Equator, one latitudinal second measures 30.715 m, one latitudinal minute is 1843 m and one latitudinal degree is 110.6 km. The circles of longitude, meridians, meet at the geographical poles, with the west–east width of a second naturally decreasing as latitude increases. On the Equator at sea level, one longitudinal second measures 30.92 m, a longitudinal minute is 1855 m and a longitudinal degree is 111.3 km. At 30° a longitudinal second is 26.76 m, at Greenwich (51°28′38″N) 19.22 m, and at 60° it is 15.42 m.

On the WGS 84 spheroid, the length in meters of a degree of latitude at latitude ϕ (that is, the number of meters you would have to travel along a north–south line to move 1 degree in latitude, when at latitude ϕ), is about

$111132.95255 - 559.84957\, \cos 2\phi + 1.17514\, \cos 4\phi - 0.00230\, \cos 6\phi$

The returned measure of meters per degree latitude varies continuously with latitude.

Similarly, the length in meters of a degree of longitude can be calculated as

$111412.877331\, \cos \phi - 93.504117\, \cos 3\phi + 0.117744\, \cos 5\phi$

(Those coefficients can be improved, but as they stand the distance they give is correct within a centimeter.)

The formulae both return units of meters per degree.

An alternative method to estimate the length of a longitudinal degree at latitude $\phi$ is to assume a spherical Earth (to get the width per minute and second, divide by 60 and 3600, respectively):

$\frac{\pi}{180}M_r\cos \phi \!$

where Earth's average meridional radius $\textstyle{M_r}\,\!$ is 6,367,449 m. Since the Earth is an oblate spheroid, not spherical, that result can be off by several tenths of a percent; a better approximation of a longitudinal degree at latitude $\phi$ is

$\frac{\pi}{180}a \cos \beta \,\!$

where Earth's equatorial radius $a$ equals 6,378,137 m and $\textstyle{\tan \beta = \frac{b}{a}\tan\phi}\,\!$; for the GRS 80 and WGS 84 spheroids, $\tfrac{b}{a}=0.99664719$. ($\textstyle{\beta}\,\!$ is known as the reduced (or parametric) latitude). Aside from rounding, this is the exact distance along a parallel of latitude; getting the distance along the shortest route will be more work, but those two distances are always within 0.6 m of each other if the two points are one degree of longitude apart.

Longitudinal length equivalents at selected latitudes
Latitude	City	Degree	Minute	Second	0.0001°
60°	Saint Petersburg	55.80 km	0.930 km	15.50 m	5.58 m
51° 28′ 38″ N	Greenwich	69.47 km	1.158 km	19.30 m	6.95 m
45°	Bordeaux	78.85 km	1.31 km	21.90 m	7.89 m
30°	New Orleans	96.49 km	1.61 km	26.80 m	9.65 m
0°	Quito	111.3 km	1.855 km	30.92 m	11.13 m

== Alternative encodings ==
Like any series of multiple-digit numbers, latitude-longitude pairs can be challenging to communicate and remember. Therefore, alternative schemes have been developed for encoding GCS coordinates into alphanumeric strings or words:

- the Maidenhead Locator System, popular with radio operators.
- the World Geographic Reference System (GEOREF), developed for global military operations, replaced by the current Global Area Reference System (GARS).
- Open Location Code or "Plus Codes", developed by Google and released into the public domain.
- Geohash, a public domain system based on the Morton Z-order curve.
- Mapcode, an open-source system originally developed at TomTom.
- What3words, a proprietary system that encodes GCS coordinates as pseudorandom sets of words by dividing the coordinates into three numbers and looking up words in an indexed dictionary.

These are not distinct coordinate systems, only alternative methods for expressing latitude and longitude measurements.

== See also ==
- Decimal degrees – Angular measurements, typically for latitude and longitude
- Geographical distance – Distance measured along the surface of the Earth
- Geographic information system – System to capture, manage, and present geographic data
- Geo URI scheme – System of geographic location identifiers
- ISO 6709, standard representation of geographic point location by coordinates
- Linear referencing – Method of spatial referencing
- Primary direction – Celestial coordinate system used to specify the positions of celestial objects
- Planetary coordinate system
- Selenographic coordinate system
- Spatial reference system – System to specify locations on Earth
