= Global Area Reference System =

Standardized geospatial reference system

The Global Area Reference System (GARS) is a standardized geospatial reference system developed by the National Geospatial-Intelligence Agency (NGA) for use across the United States Department of Defense. Under the Chairman of the Joint Chiefs of Staff Instruction CJCSI 3900.01C dated 30 June 2007, GARS was adopted for use by the US DoD as "the “area-centric” counterpart to the “point-centric” MGRS". It uses the WGS 1984 Datum and is based on lines of longitude (LONG) and latitude (LAT). It is intended to provide an integrated common frame of reference for joint force situational awareness to facilitate air-to-ground coordination, deconfliction, integration, and synchronization. This area reference system provides a common language between the components and simplifies communications. GARS is primarily designed as a battlespace management tool and not to be used for navigation or targeting.

== Design ==
- GARS divides the surface of the earth into 30-minute by 30-minute cells. Each cell is identified by a five-character designation. (ex. 006AG)
  - The first three characters designate a 30-minute wide longitudinal band. Beginning with the 180-degree meridian and proceeding eastward, the bands are numbered from 001 to 720, so that 180 E to 179 30’W is band 001; 179 30’W to 179 00’W is band 002; and so on.
  - The fourth and fifth characters designate a 30-minute wide latitudinal band. Beginning at the south pole and proceeding northward, the bands are lettered from AA to QZ (omitting I and O) so that 90 00’S to 89 30’S is band AA; 89 30’S to 89 00’S is band AB; and so on.
- Each 30-minute cell is divided into four 15-minute by 15-minute quadrants.
  - The quadrants are numbered sequentially, from west to east, starting with the northernmost band. Specifically, the northwest quadrant is “1”; the northeast quadrant is “2”; the southwest quadrant is “3”; the southeast quadrant is “4”.
  - Each quadrant is identified by a six-character designation. (ex. 006AG3) The first five characters comprise the 30-minute cell designation. The sixth character is the quadrant number.
- Each 15-minute quadrant is divided into nine 5-minute by 5-minute areas.
  - The areas are numbered sequentially, from west to east, starting with the northernmost band. The graphical representation of a 15-minute quadrant with numbered 5-minute by 5-minute areas resembles a telephone keypad.
  - Each 5-minute by 5-minute area, or keypad “key” is identified by a seven-character designation. The first six characters comprise the 15-minute quadrant designation. The seventh character is the keypad “key” number. (ex.006AG39)

== See also ==
- Military Grid Reference System
- List of geodesic-geocoding systems
