= EPSG Geodetic Parameter Dataset =

Registry of geographic reference systems

EPSG Geodetic Parameter Dataset (also EPSG registry) is a public registry of geodetic datums, coordinate reference systems, Earth ellipsoids, coordinate transformations and related units of measurement, originated by a member of the European Petroleum Survey Group (EPSG) in 1985. Each entity is assigned an EPSG code between 1024 and 32766, along with a standard machine-readable well-known text (WKT) representation. The dataset is maintained by the IOGP Geomatics Committee.

Most geographic information systems (GIS) and GIS libraries use EPSG codes as Spatial Reference System Identifiers (SRIDs) and EPSG definition data for identifying coordinate reference systems, projections, and performing transformations between these systems, while some also support SRIDs issued by other organizations (such as Esri).

== Common EPSG codes ==
- EPSG:4326 - WGS 84 datum ensemble for 2D (latitude, longitude) coordinates with 2 meter accuracy, used by the Global Positioning System among others.
- EPSG:3857 - Web Mercator projection of WGS 84, used for display by many web-based mapping tools, including Google Maps and OpenStreetMap.
- EPSG:9989 - International Terrestrial Reference Frame 2020 (ITRF2020) for 3D coordinates (latitude, longitude, ellipsoidal height) with subcentimeter accuracy, used for monitoring continental drift among others.

== History ==
The dataset was created in 1985 by Jean-Patrick Girbig of Elf, to "standardize, improve and share spatial data between members of the European Petroleum Survey Group". It was made public in 1993.

In 2005, the EPSG organisation was merged into International Association of Oil & Gas Producers (IOGP), and became the Geomatics Committee. However, the name of the EPSG registry was kept to avoid confusion. Since then, the acronym "EPSG" became increasingly synonymous with the dataset or registry itself.

== See also ==
- List of map projections
