= Larminie =

Larminie is a surname. Notable people with the surname include:

- Vera Larminie (1881–1964), English poet
- Ferdinand Geoffrey Larminie (1929–2008), Irish petroleum geologist
- William Larminie (1849–1900), Irish poet and folklorist
