= Cross-sector biodiversity initiative =

The Cross-Sector Biodiversity Initiative (CSBI)] is a partnership between IPIECA - the global oil and gas industry association for environmental and social issues, the International Council on Mining and Metals (ICMM) and the Equator Principles Association to develop and share good practices related to management of biodiversity and ecosystem services in the extractive industries.

The initiative supports the broader goals of innovative and transparent application of the mitigation hierarchy in relation to biodiversity and ecosystem services, as defined in the International Finance Corporation (IFC) Performance Standard 6: Biodiversity Conservation and Sustainable Management of Living Natural Resources (2012).

== CSBI Charter and Governance ==
The vision and mission of the initiative are presented in its Charter developed and released by the 3 partner associations in 2013. CSBI is run by its member associations and volunteers from member companies and multilateral financing institutions, with the support of a part-time coordinator.

== CBSI’s Leading Practice Tools ==
Between 2013 and 2015, CSBI released to the public three tools related to applying the mitigation hierarchy for biodiversity management, available for free on CSBI's website:

1. The Tool for Aligning Timelines for Project Execution, Biodiversity Management and Financing
2. Good Practices for the Collection of Biodiversity Baseline Data
3. The Cross-Sector Guide for Implementing the Mitigation Hierarchy

One-page summaries are available in English, French, Spanish, Italian, Japanese and Russian. Further translations are pending.
