= Equator Principles =

Risk management framework

Logo

The Equator Principles is a risk management framework adopted by financial institutions, for determining, assessing and managing environmental and social risk in project finance. It is primarily intended to provide a minimum standard for due diligence to support responsible risk decision-making. As of March 2021, 116 financial institutions in 37 countries have officially adopted the Equator Principles, covering the majority of international project finance debt in emerging and developed markets. The Equator Principles, formally launched in Washington, D.C., on June 4, 2003, were based on existing environmental and social policy frameworks established by the International Finance Corporation.

The standards have subsequently been periodically updated into what is commonly known as the International Finance Corporation Performance Standards on social and environmental sustainability and on the World Bank Group Environmental, Health, and Safety Guidelines. The Equator Principles have recently been revised and the third iteration of the Equator Principles was launched on June 4, 2013. The reviewed fourth iteration of the Equator Principles were published in July 2020.

The Equator Principles apply globally, to all industry sectors and (within EPIII) to four financial products:

1) Project Finance Advisory Services

2) Project Finance

3) Project-Related Corporate Loans and

4) Bridge Loans.

The relevant thresholds and criteria for application are described in detail in the Scope section of the Equator Principles. Equator Principles Financial Institutions (EPFIs) commit to implementing the EP in their internal environmental and social policies, procedures and standards for financing projects and will not provide Project Finance or Project-Related Corporate Loans to projects where the client will not, or is unable to, comply with the Equator Principles. While the Equator Principles are not intended to be applied retroactively, EPFIs apply them to the expansion or upgrade of an existing project where changes in scale or scope may create significant environmental and social risks and impacts or significantly change the nature or degree of an existing impact.

The Equator Principles have greatly increased the attention and focus on social/community standards and responsibility, including robust standards for indigenous peoples, labor standards, and consultation with locally affected communities within the Project Finance market. They have also promoted convergence around common environmental and social standards. Multilateral development banks, including the European Bank for Reconstruction & Development, and export credit agencies through the OECD Common Approaches are increasingly drawing on the same standards as the Equator Principles.

The Equator Principles have also helped spur the development of other responsible environmental and social management practices in the financial sector and banking industry and have provided a platform for engagement with a broad range of interested stakeholders, including non-governmental organizations (NGOs), clients and industry bodies.

== Members and reporting ==
As of April 2017, 89 financial institutions in 37 countries have officially adopted the Equator Principles.

== The principles ==
Principle 1: Review and Categorisation

Principle 2: Environmental and Social Assessment

Principle 3: Applicable Environmental and Social Standards

Principle 4: Environmental and Social Management System and Equator Principles Action Plan

Principle 5: Stakeholder Engagement

Principle 6: Grievance Mechanism

Principle 7: Independent Review

Principle 8: Covenants

Principle 9: Independent Monitoring and Reporting

Principle 10: Reporting and Transparency

== Criticism ==
NGOs have generally welcomed the Principles, but some have expressed criticism over their integrity.

A common criticism is that the Principles will not make a real difference. This criticism argues the case of the Baku-Tbilisi-Ceyhan pipeline, which, in 2004, was financed by eight Equator Principles' banks and the IFC despite an NGO assessment that found 127 alleged breaches. The banks and IFC said they were confident that the Equator Principles were followed, and said an independent consultant had confirmed this assessment.

Another criticism was that the banks might lobby the IFC to weaken its standards on which the Principles are based. The banks point out that IFC revised and strengthened its policies in 2006 and that the banks correspondingly strengthened the Equator Principles in the same year. Other criticisms include alleged lack of enforcement and accountability, free-riders, and that the scope of the principles is limited to project finance only. Several banks have sought to address these concerns by publishing summaries of their Equator Principles screening, including the number of projects they turned down for noncompliance.

In 2005 some NGOs said that one of the adopting banks, ABN AMRO (before it was split up in 2010), was the most climate-unfriendly bank in the Netherlands, with estimated annual indirect CO_{2} emissions of almost 250 million tonnes in 2005 from industries to which it provides financial services. NGOs said this was just over the annual CO_{2}-emissions of the Netherlands and almost 1% of the total annual worldwide CO_{2} emissions at the time. ABN AMRO defended its environmental record and announced steps to reduce its direct emissions, but some NGOs say it is the indirect emissions through their clients that make global banks such important targets in climate change.

Following the Dakota Access Pipeline protests, investors learned that 13 of the 17 banks that financed the Dakota Access Pipeline were signatories to the Equator Principles. Despite concerns being raised that the project could threaten the water supply from Lake Oahe and the Missouri River if a leak occurred, project financing was still approved.

== See also ==
- Corporate social responsibility
- Cross-sector biodiversity initiative
- Environmental, social and corporate governance (ESG)
- Ethical banking
- Ethical investing
- Socially responsible investing
- Special purpose entity
