= Linear referencing =

Method of spatial referencing

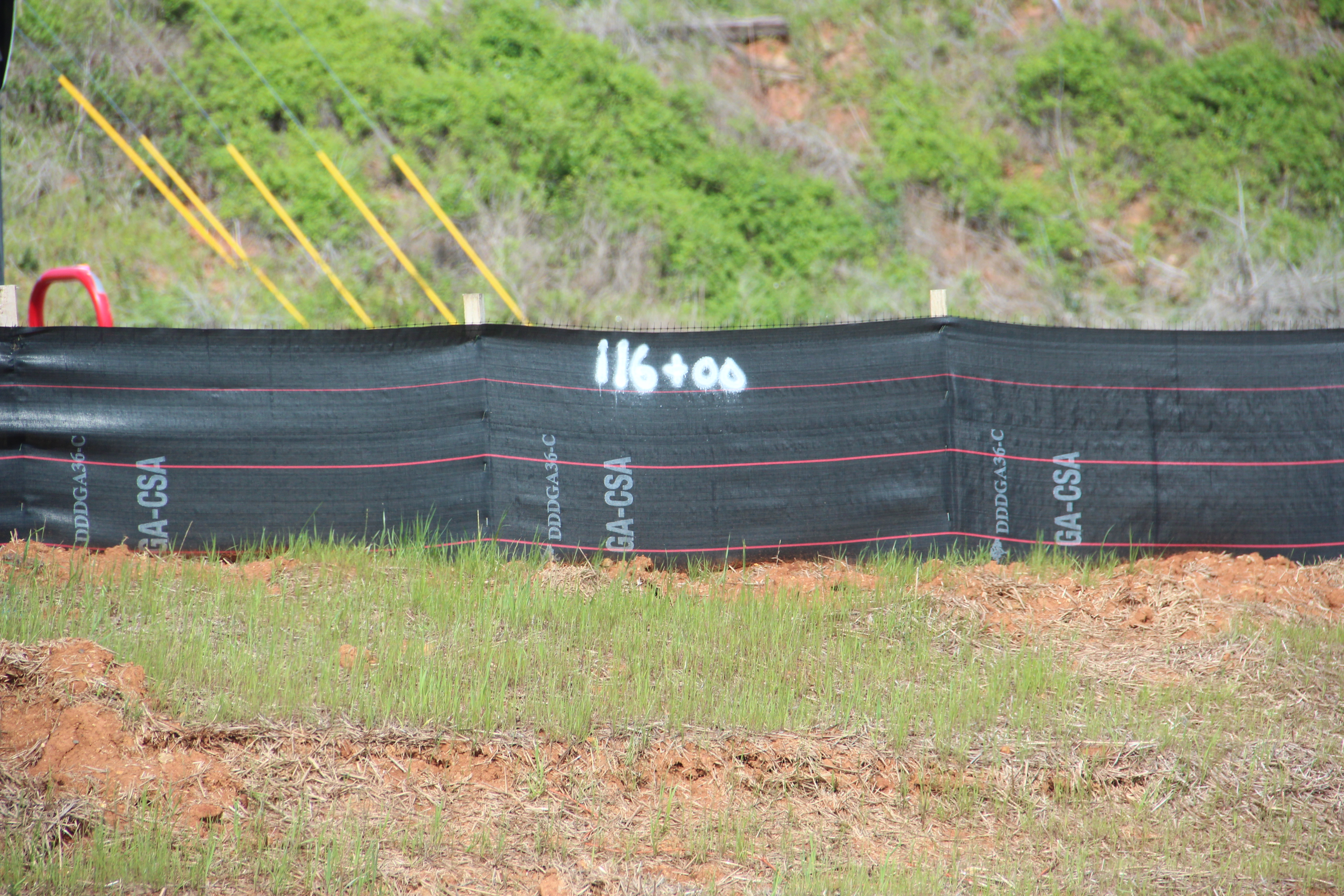
A station number written on a silt fence at a construction site

Linear referencing, also called linear reference system or linear referencing system (LRS), is a method of spatial referencing over linear or curvilinear elements, such as roads or rivers. In LRS, the locations of physical features are described parametrically in terms of a single curvilinear coordinate, typically the distance traveled from a fixed point, such as a milestone. It is an alternative to referencing by geographic coordinates, which would involve two coordinates, latitude and longitude.

Point features (e.g. a signpost) are located by a single distance value while linear features (e.g. a no-passing zone) are delimited by two distance values, corresponding to beginning and end. If the subjacent linear referencing element or route is changed, only the linear coordinates of those locations on the changed segment need to be updated. Linear referencing is suitable for management of data related to linear features like roads, railways, oil and gas transmission pipelines, power and data transmission lines, and rivers. It is used in engineering, construction, and utilities management.

== Motivation ==
A system for identifying the location of pipeline features and characteristics is by measuring distance from the start of the pipeline. An example linear reference address is: Engineering Station 1145 + 86 on pipeline Alpha = 114,586 feet from the start of the pipeline. With a reroute, cumulative stationing might not be the same as engineering stationing, because of the addition of the extra pipeline. Linear referencing systems compute the differences to resolve this dilemma.

Linear referencing is one of a family of methods of expressing location. Coordinates such as latitude and longitude are another member of the family, as are landmark references such as "5 km south of Ayers Rock." Linear referencing has traditionally been the expression of choice in engineering applications such as road and pipeline maintenance. One can more realistically dispatch a worker to a bridge 12.7 km along a road from a reference point, rather than to a pair of coordinates or a landmark. The road serves as the reference frame, just as the earth serves as the reference frame for latitude and longitude.

== Benefits ==
Linear referencing can be used to define points along a linear feature with just a small amount of information such as the name of a road and the distance and bearing from a landmark along the road. This information can be communicated concisely via plaintext. For example: "State route 4, 20 feet east of mile marker 187." Giving a latitude and longitude coordinate to a work crew is not meaningful unless the coordinate is plotted on a map. Often work crews work in remote areas without wireless connectivity which makes on-line digital maps not practical, and the relatively higher effort of providing offline maps or printed maps is not as economical as simply stating locations as offsets, or ranges of offsets, along a linear feature.

Linear referencing systems can also be made to be both very precise and very accurate at a much lower cost than is needed to collect latitude and longitude coordinates with high accuracy, especially when the goal is sub-meter accuracy. This is highly dependent upon the width of the linear feature, its centerline, and the visibility of the landmarks and markers that are used to define linear reference offsets.

Often, roads are created by engineers using CAD tools that have no geospatial reference at all, and LRS is the preferred method of defining data for linear features.

== Limitations ==
Consequently, a major limitation of linear referencing is that specifying points that are not on a linear feature is troublesome and error-prone, though not entirely impossible. Consider for example a ski lodge located 100 meters to the right of the road, traveling north. The linear referencing system can be extended by specifying a lateral offset, but the absolute location (i.e. coordinates) of the lodge cannot be determined unless coordinates are specified for the road; that process is prone to error particularly on curved roads.

Another major drawback of linear referencing is that a modification in the alignment of a road (e.g. constructing a bypass around a town) changes the measurements that reference all downstream points. The system requires an extensive network of reference stations, and constant maintenance. In an era of mobile maps and GPS, this maintenance overhead for linear referencing systems challenges its long-term viability. (But see below for US Federal Highway Administration requirement that all State DOTs use LRS.)

Nonetheless, travel along a road is a linear experience, and at the very least, linear referencing will continue to have a conversational role. Linear referencing systems are recognized by the US Federal government as a valuable tool for specifying right of way data, and are now actually required for the States. Therefore, it is not likely to see LRS usage decline any time soon.

== Applications ==
=== ARNOLD: US Federal Requirements for Highways ===
The US Federal Highway Administration is pushing states to move closer to standardization of LRS data with the ARNOLD requirement. To wit:

"On August 7, 2012, FHWA announced that the HPMS is expanding the requirement for State Departments of Transportation (DOTs) to submit their LRS to include all public roads. This requirement will be referred to as the All Road Network of Linear Referenced Data (ARNOLD)".

The ARNOLD requirement sets the stage for systems that utilize both LRS and coordinates. Both systems are useful in different contexts, and while using latitude and longitude is becoming very popular due to the availability of practical and affordable devices for capturing and displaying global coordinate data, the use of LRS has widely been adopted for planning, engineering, and maintenance.

== Supported platforms ==
Linear referencing is supported for example by several Geographic Information System software, including:

- Intergraph
- GE Global Transmission Office
- ArcGIS
- GEOMAP GIS
- GRASS GIS
- PostGIS
- QGIS

== See also ==
- Chainage (also known as station references) in construction surveying
- Exit number
- Geocoding
- Geographic coordinate system
- Length measurement
- Milestone
- Road map
- Zero mile
