= Exit number =

Number assigned to a road junction

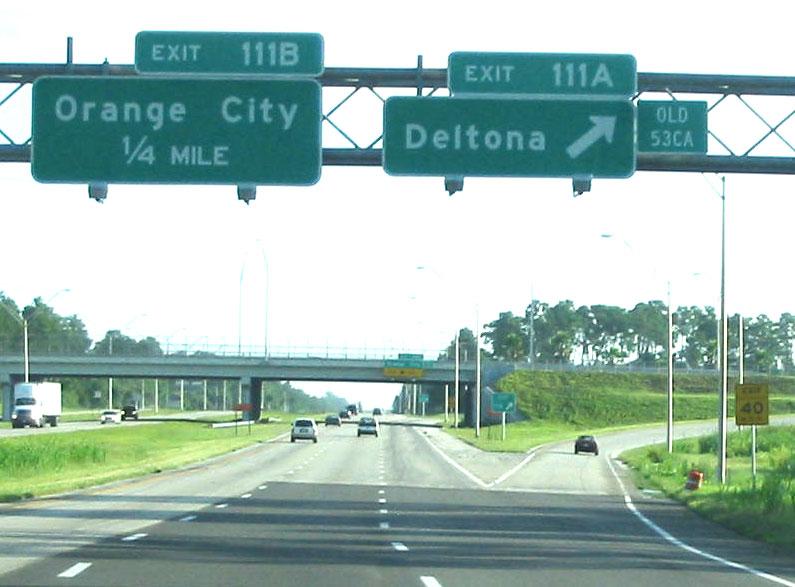
Exit numbers on Interstate 4 in Volusia County, Florida. In this case, mile-based exits 111A and 111B had been sequential exits 53CA and 53CB, as the 'OLD 53CA' tab shows.

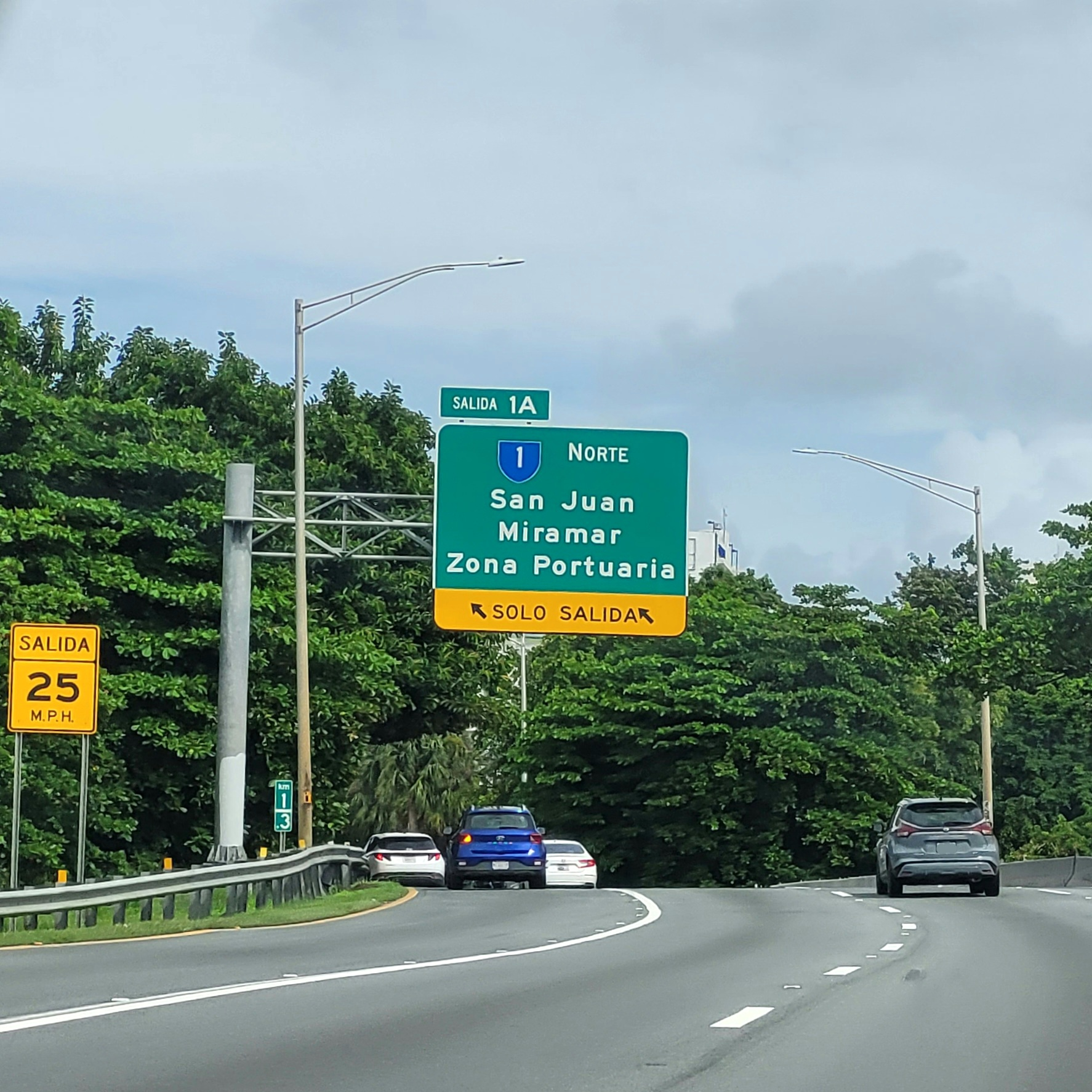
Puerto Rico is the only place in the United States that uses Spanish, like this "Salida 1A" sign.

An exit number is a number assigned to a road junction, usually an exit from a freeway. It is usually marked on the same sign as the destinations of the exit. In some countries, including the United States and Canada, it is also marked on a sign in the gore.

Exit numbers typically reset at political borders such as state or provincial lines.

Some non-freeways use exit numbers. An extreme case of this was in New York City, US, where the Grand Concourse and Linden Boulevard were given sequential numbers, one per intersection (neither boulevard has had exit numbers since 2011). A less extreme version was used on the West Side Highway, also in New York, where only the major intersections are numbered, possibly to match the planned exits on the cancelled Westway freeway. Another case is the Nanaimo Parkway in Nanaimo, British Columbia, Canada, Highway 19, where all exits are numbered, though all except one are at-grade intersections. Some other intersections on Highway 19 outside Nanaimo are also given numbers. As a means of educating motorists, some state highway maps include a brief explanation of the exit numbering system on an inset. Iowa DOT maps from the 1970s and 1990s included a picture or drawing of a milepost and briefly described how Iowa had included milepost references near interchanges on the map.

== Sequential numbers ==
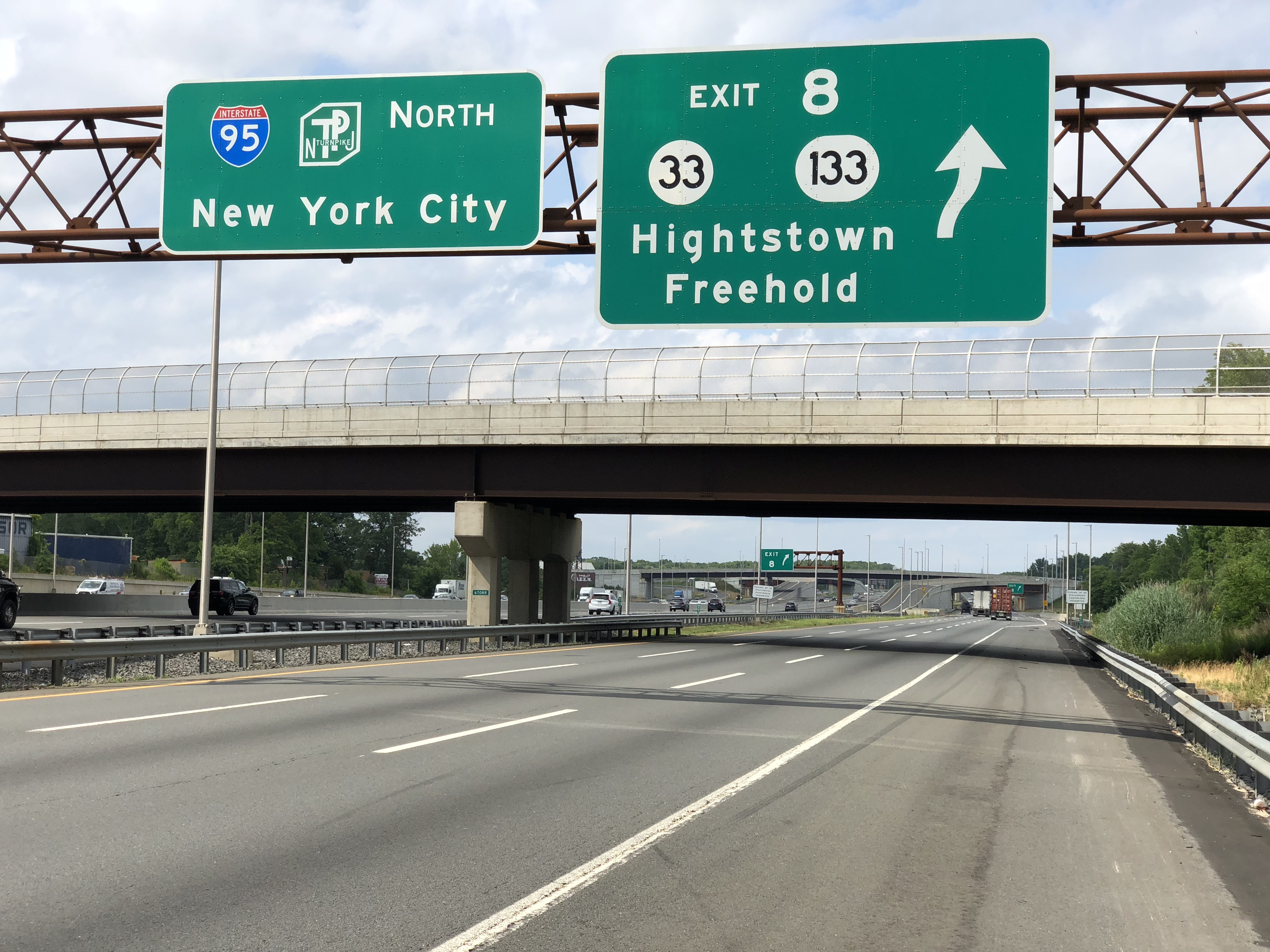
The New Jersey Turnpike at exit 8. This interchange was opened in 1951.

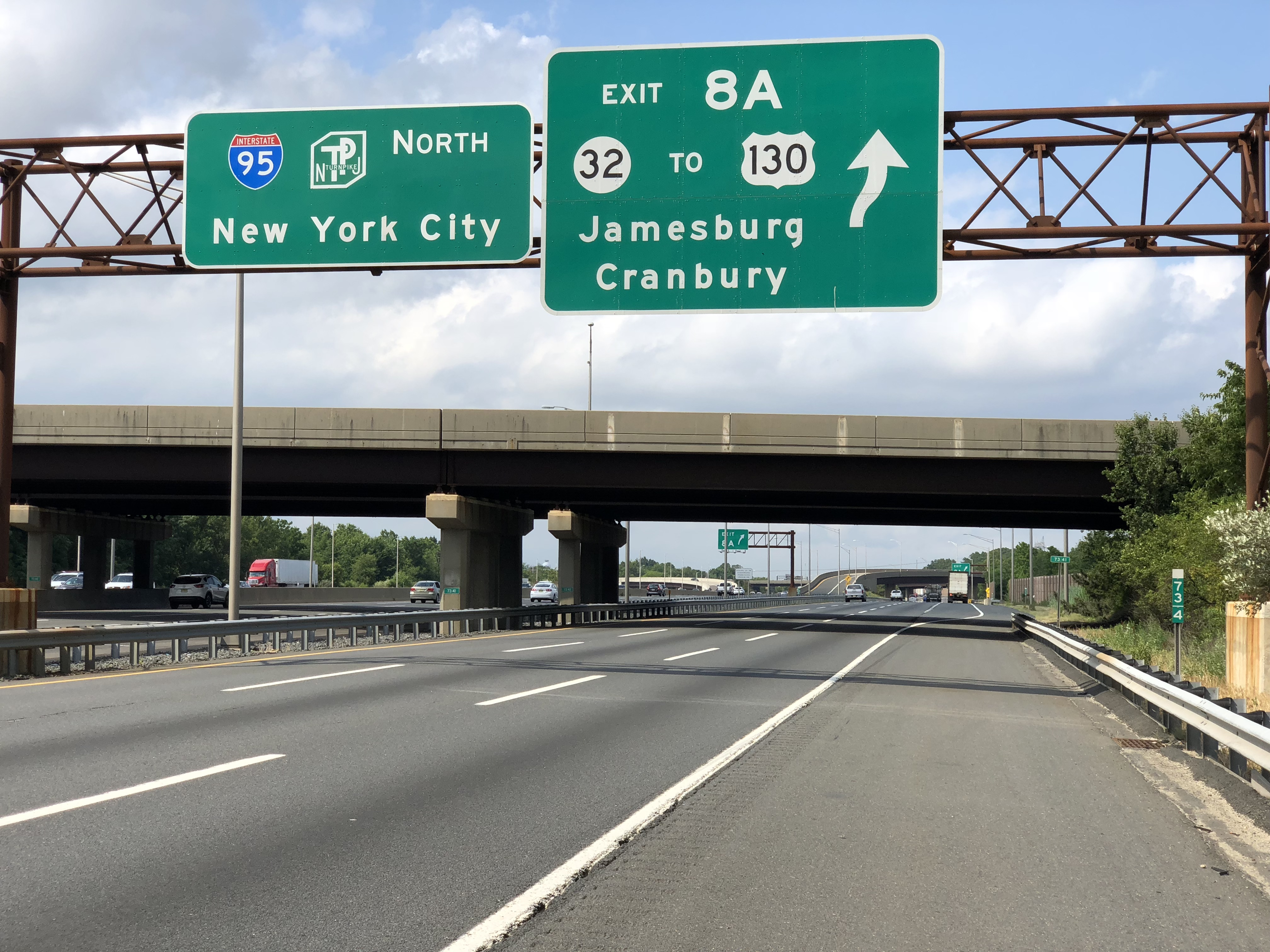
The New Jersey Turnpike at exit 8A several miles north of exit 8. This interchange was opened in 1966, which is why the suffix exists.

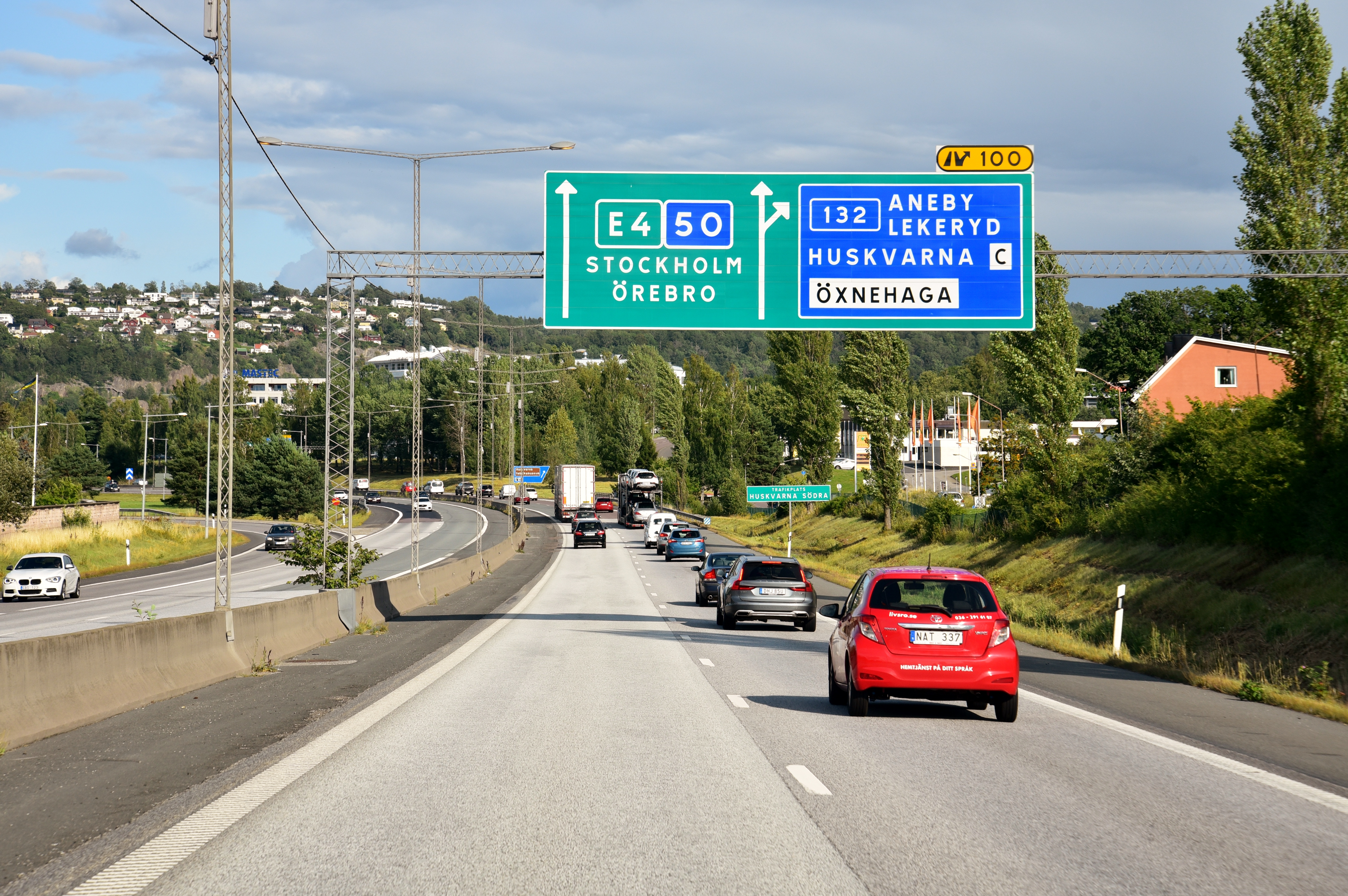
An exit numbered 100 on European route E4 in Jönköping, Sweden. The exit numbers on E4 begin at 65 in Helsingborg, and match to those on E20, which it meets in Södertälje.

Sequential exit numbering usually begins with exit 1 at the beginning of the road; each subsequent exit is given the next number. Letter suffixes are commonly used when new exits are added. For example, on the New York State Thruway, an exit was added between 21 and 22 where the Berkshire Connector meets the Thruway mainline, and was given the number 21A. Subsequently, a new exit providing access to US 9W was added between 21 and 21A, leading to the sequence 21 – 21B – 21A – 22. In Florida, some new exits got the suffix C, so that if it had or acquired separate exits for the two directions, they would be 15CA and 15CB rather than 15AB. There are also occurrences of this happening on the New Jersey Turnpike; the original interchanges opened in 1951, with newer exits as recently as 2004. On the Baltimore Beltway, there is an exit 12B-C (MD 372), as well as 12A (US 1). There is also an exit 8A (I-895) and an exit 8 (MD 168).

Some sequential exits are renumbered (remaining sequential) due to added exits. For instance, the Hutchinson River Parkway in New York was renumbered so that its northernmost exit, 27, became 30. However, the Merritt Parkway, which continued the Hutchinson's exit numbers in Connecticut, was not renumbered. This means the Route 120A interchange is numbered 27 in Connecticut and 30 in New York.

The Atlantic City-Brigantine Connector in Atlantic City, New Jersey, uses letters (without numbers) for its exits; it has many exits in a short distance, and the South Jersey Transportation Authority may have wanted to avoid numbers, as the Atlantic City Expressway's lowest numbers (mile-based) are in Atlantic City.

== Distance-based numbers ==
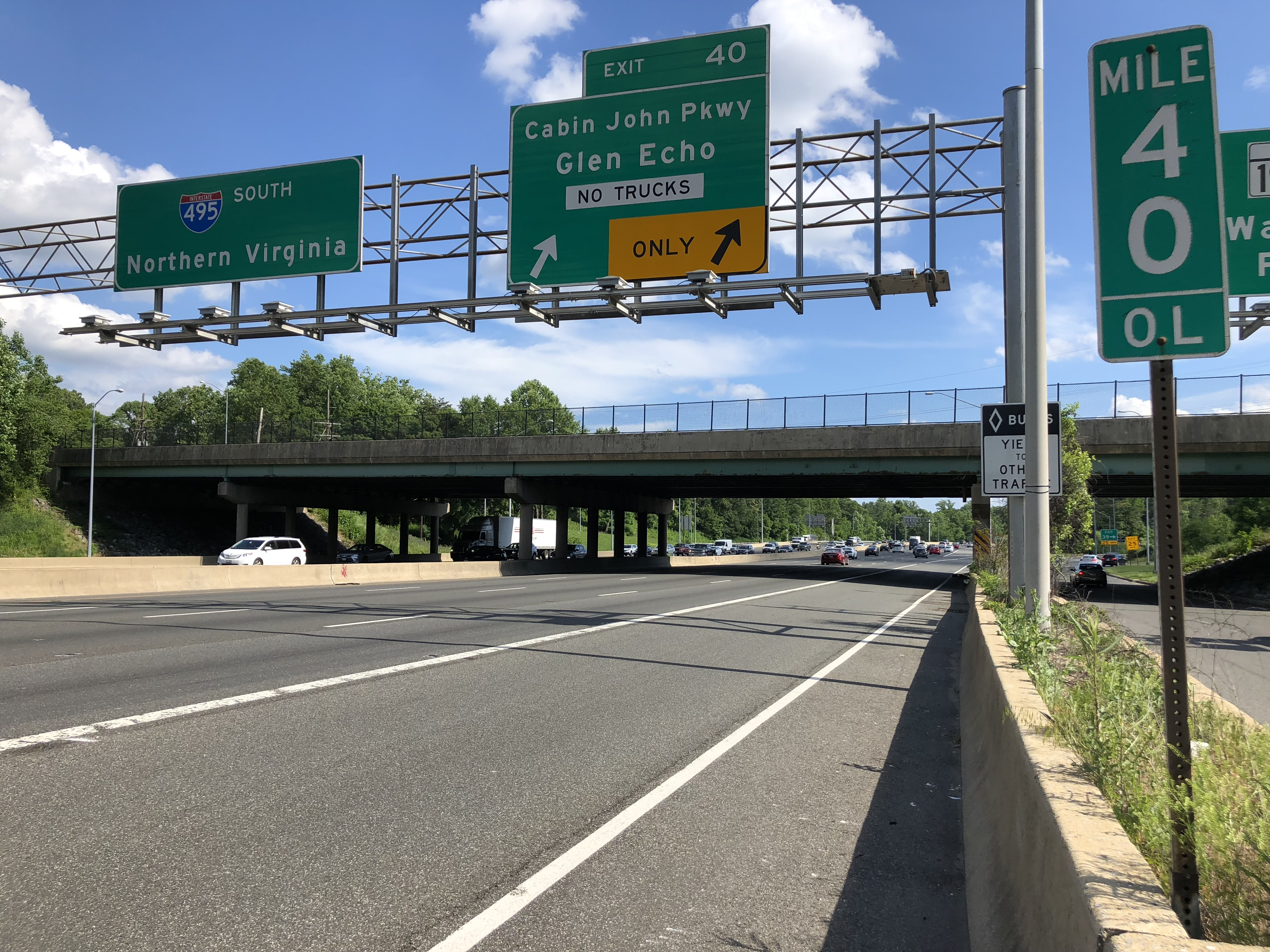
Exit 40 along the Capital Beltway (I-495) circling Washington, D.C., which is located at milepost 40

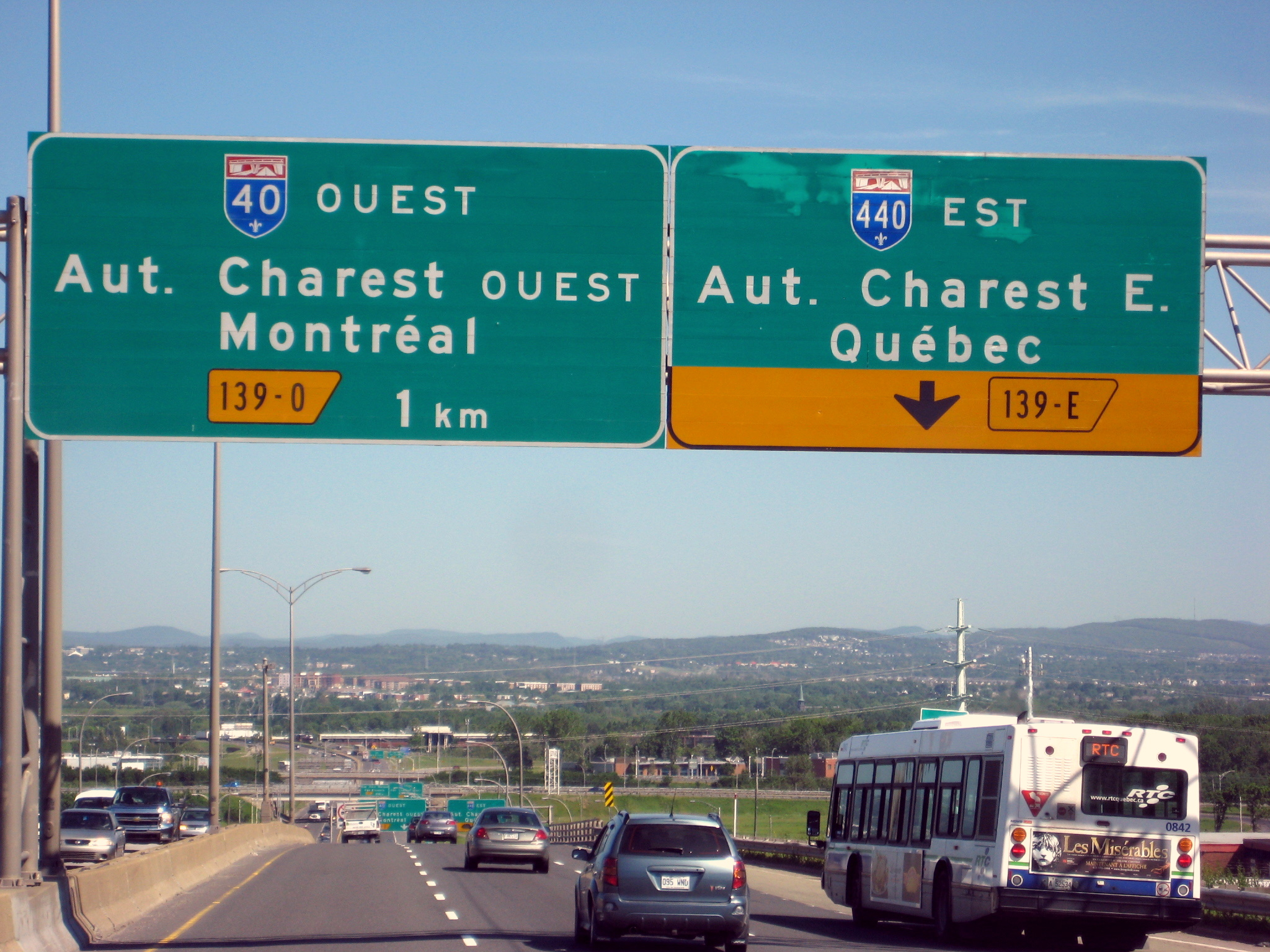
An exit sign (kilometer-based) on Quebec Autoroute 73

As more highways were built, states and countries began to experiment with distance-based (mile-based or kilometer-based) exit numbers. The first mile-based system known was implemented on the Garden State Parkway in New Jersey in the late 1950s. Michigan also implemented mile-based junction numbers on Interstate 94 in the 1960s. In this system, the number of miles from the beginning of the highway to the exit is used for the exit number. If two exits would end up with the same number, the numbers are sometimes modified slightly; unless there are too many in proximity, and exits are given sequential or directional suffixes, just as with sequential numbers. Distance based numbering is the norm for most highways in the United States and Canada. Many jurisdictions in North America began switching to distance based in the 1980s, with some projects still ongoing currently to convert towards a distance based system. These are further complemented by mile markers or KM markers.

An exit can be numbered by where the exit in the direction of increased mileage leaves the freeway, or by where the road that the exit serves crosses the freeway (which is occasionally ambiguous). From this number, the integer exit number can be determined by rounding up, rounding down, or rounding to the nearest integer. Many jurisdictions prefer to avoid an exit 0. (Note: While the FHWA allows exits that are numbered "0", they do not require its use. For example, both the Massachusetts Department of Transportation and the Connecticut Department of Transportation have chosen not to incorporate these exits statewide.) To this end, the numbers are either rounded up to get the exit number, or any exit that would get the number 0 is instead numbered 1. Examples of highways with an exit 0 are British Columbia Highway 1 on the mainland, Interstate 70 in Wheeling, West Virginia, along the West Virginia–Ohio border, and Interstate 90 on the Montana side of the Idaho–Montana border.

Some freeways' exit numbers start from an advanced number (i.e. higher than 1). One reason for starting with a number higher than 1 is that the maintaining agency expects that the highway will be extended. For example, Ontario Highway 400 starts at 20 because it was expected that the southern end of the highway would extend to downtown Toronto (which was never built). Another reason to use a higher number is that the freeway is branching off from another freeway. An example is British Columbia Highway 5, which branches off British Columbia Highway 1 and starts at 170.

In areas that use the metric system, distance-based numbers are by kilometer rather than by mile. A number of highways have kilometer-based exit numbers, even in areas that typically use miles; an example of this is with Interstate 19 in the US state of Arizona.

== Exit numbers by country ==
=== Australia ===
Distance-based exit numbering is used in Queensland, although there is not a consistent approach for defining the datum. For example, exit numbers may increase from south to north or north to south.

Victoria and New South Wales have partially implemented sequential exit numbering on selected urban motorways. For instance, the M31 Hume Motorway in New South Wales has exit numbering between Prestons and Campbelltown.

=== Europe ===
Exit numbers in most countries in Continental Europe

Most European countries use sequential numbering schemes. Spain uses distance-based numbering on its Autovias, but not on its Autopistas. Austria, the Czech Republic, Hungary and Slovakia use distance-based schemes. A number of European countries (including the Netherlands, Belgium and France) do not number motorway intersections, apparently because one cannot "exit" the motorway there. Countries like Germany and Switzerland number interchanges, but instead of the usual exit symbol, they are given a specific interchange symbol.

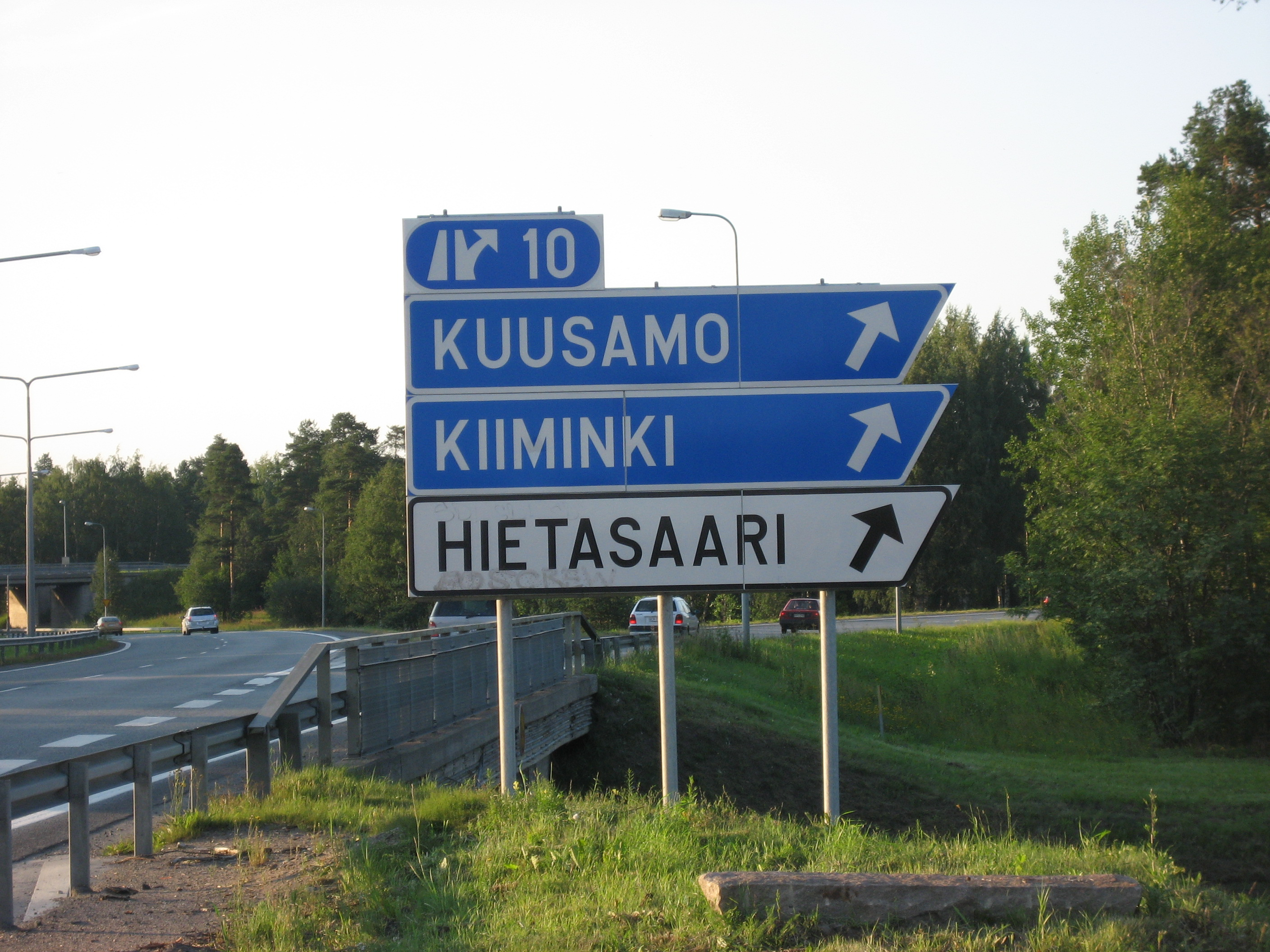
Exit 10 at the intersection of the highway 20 on the highway 4 (E8/E75) in Oulu, Finland

Italy uses sequential numbering on the ring roads for some cities, including the ring road of Rome (GRA) and Milan (Tangenziali). At one time, it referred to junctions on the Autostrada del Sole by number, and published same on toll tickets; though these may not have been posted on signs.

A UK motorway sign showing a junction number (25)

Both the United Kingdom and the Republic of Ireland use sequential numbering systems, with the junction number indicated by a white number in a black square in the corner of signs. In the United Kingdom they are frequently referenced in the media as the number with "J" prefixed to it, with for example Junction 58 being referred to as "J58"; as such this abbreviated term has entered popular usage. If a junction is newly constructed between two existing junctions, it is normally allocated the number of the lower of the two junctions, with the letter "A" attached, followed by "B", then "C" (and so on). For example, a new junction opened between Junctions 86 and 87 would become Junction 86A, and if a new junction opened between Junctions 86A and 87, it would be Junction 86B.

In the Republic of Ireland, junction numbers have existed since the opening of the first section of the M50 motorway in 1990. Since 2005 have been given greater prominence on road signs. With the development of the inter-urban motorway network in the 2000s, the National Roads Authority adopted a numbering scheme for the inter-urban roads that saw Junction 1 be designated as that road's junction with the M50 in most cases. This has meant renumbering of existing junctions on some motorways, most notably the M7 motorway. Non-motorway dual carriageways forming part of major inter-urban roads also have junction numbers; however, only grade-separated interchanges are numbered.

Countries like Germany and Denmark do not number exits on single carriageway routes that are open only to motorised traffic.

=== Canada ===
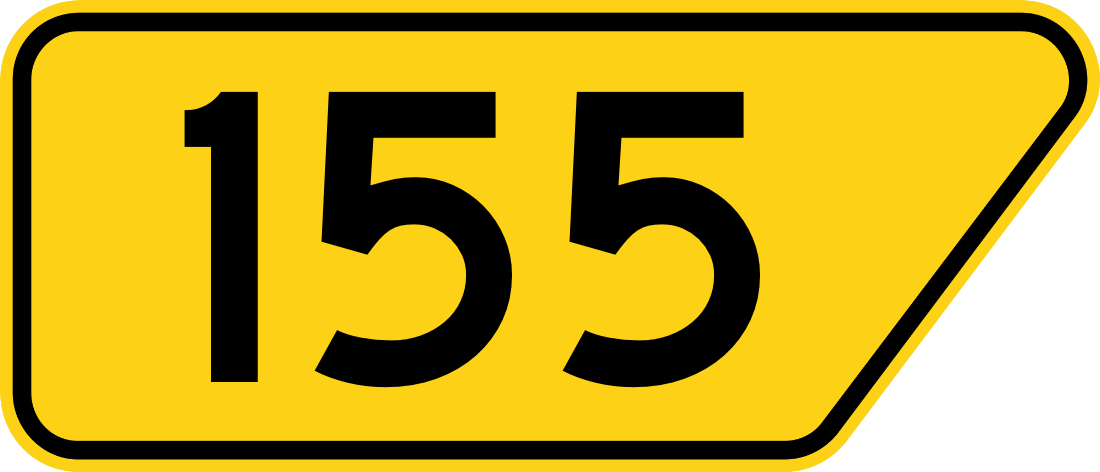
An exit number on a Québec Autoroute

Of the provinces that have numbered exit signs on their highways, the majority either use distance based or have switched to using distance based systems. Some highways may also supplement their roads with kilometer-based distance markers at specific intervals on the side of the road.

- Ontario has the oldest exit number system, having started posting exit numbers sequentially in the 1960s along Highway 401; it switched to mile-based (distance) numbering before Canada went metric. Most short freeways do not have exit numbers, and until about 2000 (with Highways 11 and 69/400), incomplete freeways also lacked exit numbers. Interchanges with multiple exits are lettered A-B. On some highways, Ontario uses KM markers on the side, such as the 401 in Northumberland County.
- Quebec has the second oldest system; it began sequential but switched to mile-based (distance) junction numbering before the Canadian metric conversion in the mid-1970s. Unlike Ontario, Quebec uses cardinal directions for multiple exits: E ("est"), N ("nord"), S ("sud"), and O ("ouest"); an example of the latter is 20-O (with a hyphen) to avoid confusion with the number.
- British Columbia uses distance-based exit numbers on its freeways. Some highways, such as Highway 91, have kilometer marker signs on the side.
- Manitoba has the fewest posted exit numbers. Highway 1 has three numbered exits. Exit numbers were first posted on the Perimeter Highway in 2001.
- Alberta has the newest exit number system. The province started posting exit numbers on Highway 2 in 2004, and has since extended the system to Highways 1, 16, 201, and 216. In 2006, Alberta started building roadside kilometer markers in a few highways. Spacing is typically every four kilometers.
- Saskatchewan has recently switched to using the distance based system. This started with the Regina Bypass project where distance based exits are now used on the freeway. It uses distance-based exit numbers along with exits lettered A-B for interchanges with multiple exits. On a section of Highway 11 from Regina to Lumsden, letters "A", "B", and "C" are used sequentially as "exit letters" instead, making Saskatchewan mainly a distanced-based system that utilizes a bit of sequential lettering as well.
- New Brunswick originally started out using sequential numbering but has switched to using distance based exit signs.

Sequential numbers are used only in Nova Scotia, and Newfoundland and Labrador.

- Nova Scotia also numbers level junctions on designated express highways. Multiple exits at an interchange use N-S, or E-W. (Nova Scotia also uses exit 0 where an interchange is opened "before" Exit 1.) In some instances, exit numbers are skipped, usually as the result of new sections of 4-lane divided highway opening while the old arterial highway is downgraded to a collector highway. On Highway 104, exits 2, 9, 14, 16 and 34 are skipped.
- Newfoundland and Labrador uses sequential numbering for exit signs. Controlled access freeways in the province only exist around the St John's metropolitan area.

The territories of Yukon, Nunavut, and Northwest Territories use no exit numbers, as there are no freeways or expressways in the territories.

Prince Edward Island does not use exit numbers. The only limited access highway runs between New Haven and North River (part of the Trans Canada Highway), which features two interchanges, both unnumbered. The Albany Corner interchange near Borden-Carleton is the only other grade-separated exit.

=== Hong Kong ===
Exit numbers using a sequential numbering scheme were introduced to major Hong Kong routes in 2004, in conjunction with the reorganization of the route numbers.

=== Japan ===
The main expressway system uses sequential numbering; Metropolitan Expressway systems also use sequential junction numbering, usually appended with the expressway number expressed thus: 5–1; 5–2, etc. There are multiple toll expressways not operated by the major national syndicates or the Metropolitan Expressway Authorities that have no junction numbering scheme.

=== New Zealand ===
New Zealand began introducing exit numbers in the Auckland region in 2005. It uses a distance-based numbering system. The distance to the exit is measured from the origin of the highway. That is:

- State Highway 1 (Northern and Southern Motorways) measured from the origin of SH1 at Cape Reinga
- State Highway 16 (Northwestern Motorway) measured from the origin at the Port
- State Highway 18 (Upper Harbour Motorway) measured from the origin at SH1
- State Highway 20 (Southwestern Motorway) measured from the origin at SH1

There is no exit zero. If there is an exit within 1.499 km of the origin, Exit 1 is used. Exit 2 would be between 1.500 and 2.499 km of the origin. Subsequent 'exit zones' are at 1 km intervals. Letter suffixes are added at multi-exit interchanges, or where two or more exits exist within the same exit zone. For example, State Highway 1 (Southern Motorway) has an Exit 429A (Symonds St), Exit 429B (Wellesley St) and Exit 429C (Port). Instead of replacing existing ramp and link signs, the exit numbers were added as supplementary information. Thus drivers can navigate either by exit number or name. Exit numbers are only used for exits that may be used by all vehicle types. Bus- or emergency vehicle-only exits would not be numbered.

Exit numbers are not used outside the Auckland region.

There is a proposed exit number system for Wellington.

=== Philippines ===
Exit gore sign in the Philippines

Metric distance-based numbers are used on the tollways radiating from Manila. Supplemental "A" and "B" designations are appended to signage at the ends of slip roads.

=== South Africa ===
Uses distance based numbering (in kilometers) on main motorways. Letter suffixes are added at multi-exit interchanges, an example being the Buccleuch interchange in Johannesburg.

Exit numbers are reset on the borders of the provinces as they were until 1994. This means that exit numbering may change in the middle of a province.

One exception to the usual distance based numbering is the southern portion of the M4 in Durban, which uses sequential numbering.

=== Taiwan ===
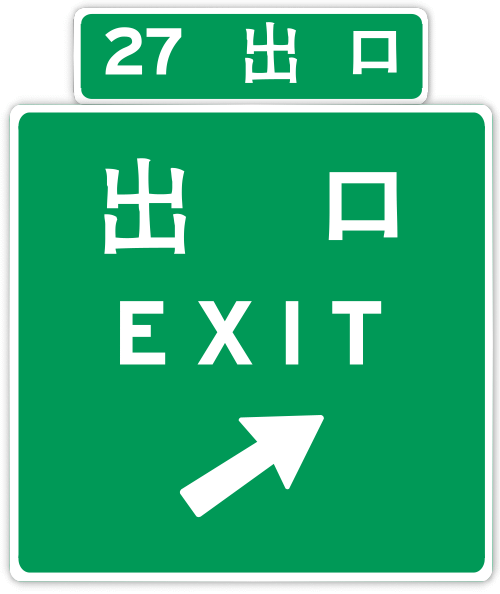
Taiwan exit sign prior to 2006

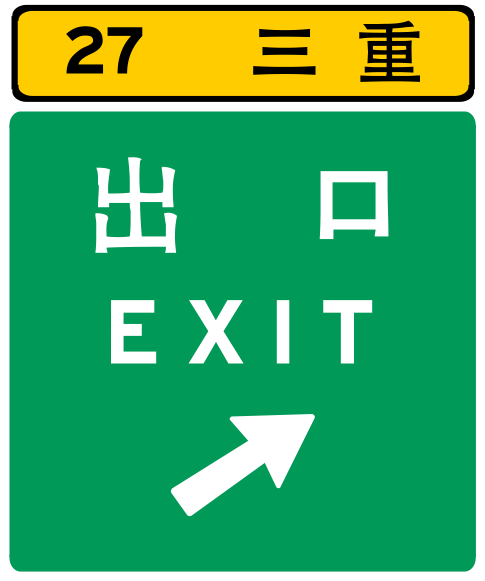
Current Taiwan exit sign

Taiwan uses distance-based exit numbers in kilometers. If two exits are located within the same kilometer mark, the Roman letters are appended to differentiate the exits. Taiwan did experiment with sequential exit numbers on National Freeway No. 1 for a couple of years, but abandoned the experiment in 2004.

Prior to 2006, Taiwan exit signs generally resembled near replicas of their US counterparts. However, the exit signs now indicate not only the distance number but also the Chinese code-name for the interchange.

== See also ==
- Linear referencing
