= Ferdinand Geoffrey Larminie =

Irish petroleum geologist

Ferdinand Geoffrey "Geoff" Larminie OBE (23 June 1929, Dublin – 16 October 2008, Buckinghamshire) was an Irish petroleum geologist, known for his contributions to the British Petroleum Company's operations involving the western part of the Prudhoe Bay Oil Field.

== Early life and education ==
After secondary education at St Andrew's College, Dublin, F. Geoffrey Larminie matriculated at Trinity College Dublin. There he graduated with a double first in geology and zoology in 1954 and gained his MA in 1972. He was from 1954 to 1956 an assistant lecturer in geology at the University of Glasgow and from 1956 to 1960 a lecturer at the University of Sydney.

== Business career ==
In 1960 he joined the Exploration Department of the British Petroleum Company. From 1960 to 1966 he worked as an exploration geologist in the UK, Greece, Alaska, and Kuwait. In Greece and Alaska he did a great amount of fieldwork. In 1964 he led the expedition to the Sadlerochit sandstone formation in the Sadlerochit Mountains of Alaska's Brooks Range. The expedition exposed the existence of oil reservoirs in Triassic strata. He was sent in 1966 to Libya as a senior geologist.

In 1967 Geoffrey Larminie was posted to Alaska. He played an essential role in the history of the British Petroleum Company related to the discovery in 1968 of the Prudhoe Bay Oil Field. He was appointed Area Manager in Alaska and dealt excellently with the various government authorities and agencies regulating the development of the oil field. For his achievements, the British government in 1971 appointed him Officer of the British Empire (OBE). In a 1969 conference at the University of Alaska Anchorage, Larminie and other oilmen argued against Robert Engler's criticisms of the oil industry.

In 1971 Larminie was transferred from Alaska to serve as Head of the British Petroleum Company's exploration activities in Thailand. In 1974 he was transferred to the British Petroleum Group Head Office in London. Within the Scientific Advisory and Information Department, he was for two years General Manager of the Public Affairs and Information Department and then was appointed General Manager of the Environmental Control Centre, as well as External Affairs Coordinator, Health, Safety and Environmental Services. He had "responsibility for the environmental impacts of the BP Group’s operations worldwide". In a 1977 letter to the journal Nature, he commented, in relation to earthquake dangers to the Alaska Pipeline, that there was no record of a crude oil pipeline rupturing as a result of an earthquake. During the 1980s he held several appointments to various public and private sector institutions. He chaired the International Petroleum Industry Environmental Conservation Association (IPIECA) from 1981 to 1983. He was a member from 1979 to 1984 of the Royal Commission on Environmental Pollution and from 1984 to 1987 of the Polar Research Board of the National Research Council of the United States. From 1983 to 1987 he served on the UK's Natural Environment Research Council (NERC) Council. In 1987 he retired from the British Petroleum Company.

For three years from 1987 to 1990, Geoffrey Larminie was the director of the British Geological Survey. From 1991 to 2008 he was a director for a privately held company, which had the name "Cambridge Arctic Shelf Programme" from 1988 to 2002 and in 2002 was renamed "CASP". He was a director from 1992 to 1995 for the Society for Underwater Technology and from 2001 to 2008 a director for the Chiltern Society, a non-profit organization for preservation of habitats and heritage sites in the Chiltern Hills.

== Recognition ==
Larminie's honours included in 1989 Honorary Fellowship of Trinity College Dublin and in 1991 Life Trusteeship of the Bermuda Biological Station. He was in 1992 part of the British Petroleum team that jointly received the MacRobert Award for the work that led to the discovery of Prudhoe Bay Oil Field. In 1992 he was also elected to Honorary Fellowship of the Society for Underwater Technology.

== Personal life ==
Geoffrey and Helen Larminie were married in April 1956 in Dublin. Upon his death in October 2008 he was survived by his widow, daughter Susan, son Christopher, and three grandsons. Helen Larminie died in March 2012.

== Selected publications ==
- Larminie, F.G. (1971). "The Arctic as an Industrial Environment - Some Aspects of Petroleum Development in Northern Alaska". Journal of Petroleum Technology. 23: 19–26. doi:10.2118/3295-PA.
- Montgomery, J. D.; Cope, D. R.; Larminie, F. G.; Ritchie, W.; Rees, Judith; Munton, R. J. C.; MacRory, Richard; Garner, J. F.; O'Riordan, Timothy (1982). "Environmental Impact Assessment in the Context of Economic Recession: Discussion". The Geographical Journal. 148 (3): 355–361. Bibcode:1982GeogJ.148..355M. doi:10.2307/633153. JSTOR 633153.
- Larminie, Geoffrey (1983). "The impact of industrial development on the arctic environment". Cold Regions Science and Technology. 7: 299–302. Bibcode:1983CRST....7..299L. doi:10.1016/0165-232X(83)90076-9.
- Larminie, F. G. (1984). "Britain's Offshore Resource Industries". The Future of British Sea Power. pp. 70–71. doi:10.1007/978-1-349-07617-8_8. ISBN 978-1-349-07619-2.
- Larminie, F. G. (1987). "The history and future of North Sea oil and gas: An environmental perspective". Philosophical Transactions of the Royal Society of London. B, Biological Sciences. 316 (1181): 487–493. Bibcode:1987RSPTB.316..487L. doi:10.1098/rstb.1987.0033.
- Jørgensen-Dahl, Arnfinn; Østreng, Willy, eds. (1991). "The Mineral Potential of Antarctica: The State of the Art by Geoffrey Larminie". The Antarctic Treaty System in World Politics. London: Palgrave Macmillan. pp. 79–93. doi:10.1007/978-1-349-12471-8_7. ISBN 978-1-349-12473-2. abstract
- Larminie, F.G. (1993). "The Braer incident: Workshop presentation". Marine Policy. 17 (5): 483–485. Bibcode:1993MarPo..17..483L. doi:10.1016/0308-597X(93)90070-J.
- Cairns, W. J.; Rogers, P. M., eds. (2 September 2003). "Chapter 1. Environmental Aspects of the Development of North Sea Oil by F. G. Larminie". Onshore Impacts of Offshore Oil. CRC Press. pp. 5–10. ISBN 9780203210178.
- Cairns, W. J.; Rogers, P. M., eds. (2 September 2003). "Chapter 8. Forties Field Development: The Environmental Aspect by M. M. Linning and F. G. Larminie". Onshore Impacts of Offshore Oil. CRC Press. pp. 85–98. ISBN 9780203210178.
