= Vera Larminie =

Member of the Royal Geographical Society (1886–1964)

- Born: 20 or 23 June 1881; Sheffield, U.K.
- Died: 12 June 1964 (aged 82); Hastings, U.K.
- Occupations: Secretary; Poet; Scientific card indexer
- Scientific career
- Workplaces: Society for Psychical Research; British Museum (Natural History)

Vera Larminie (1881–1964) was one of the earliest women to be admitted as a Member of the Royal Geographical Society, in 1913. Larminie was also known for a volume of poetry she wrote with her sister, the novelist and Badminton champion Margaret Tragett. In the early 1900s Larminie worked at the Society for Psychical Research. In her later life Larminie worked as a scientific card indexer at the British Museum (Natural History).

== Early life and family ==
Vera Larminie was born on 20 or 23 June 1881 in Sheffield, Yorkshire. Her parents were Edward Merry Larminie (c. 1841–1905), who was a Lieutenant Colonel in the Royal Engineers, and Laura Frances Marshall (née Pollock, 1846–1912), who had married in 1878. Larminie's full siblings were: Stanley Graham Larminie (c. 1879–1929), Lionel Edward Larminie (1883–1926) Marcus John Larminie (b. & d. 1884) and Margaret Rivers Larminie (1885–1964, married name Margaret Tragett).

Larminie's mother Laura had been divorced in 1878 by her first husband Charles Henry Tilson Marshall after she began a romance with Edward Merry Larminie, and she had lost custody of the children from her marriage to Marshall including Larminie's half siblings the writer Maud Diver (1867–1945) and the entomologist Guy Anstruther Knox Marshall (1871–1959). Larminie's maternal grandfather was Sir Frederick Pollock (1783–1870), lawyer and at one time Attorney General.

== Career ==
Larminie was trained as a secretary, and she was fluent in English and French. Larminie was an assistant secretary at the Society for Psychical Research from 1903 to 1905, when she had to resign on the grounds of ill-health. While working at the Society, Larminie participated in, and helped to record, experiments to investigate Telepathy conducted by Northcote Whitridge Thomas. Larminie also translated work by Joseph Grasset from French to English for the Society's Proceedings.

In 1913, the Royal Geographical Society, after many years of wrestling with the decision, decided to formally admit female members of whom Larminie was among the earliest, being admitted on 24 November 1913. Larminie was also elected as a Member of the Geologist's Association in 1919. Larminie's signature appears on page 24 of a social scrapbook album made by the geologist Mary Sophia Johnston (1875–1955) at the start of the twentieth century, alongside Marie Stopes and Dorothea Bate, and many others.

In 1918, Larminie published a book of poetry with her sister Margaret Rivers Larminie, titled Out of the East: And Other Poems. The volume was published as part of the academic publisher Blackwell's 'Adventurer's All' series, intended to showcase new poets. Although reviewed positively, with Vera considered to have a more direct voice than Margaret, this was the only work of poetry that the sisters ever published, and Vera's only published creative work, although Margaret went on to have a successful career as a novelist.

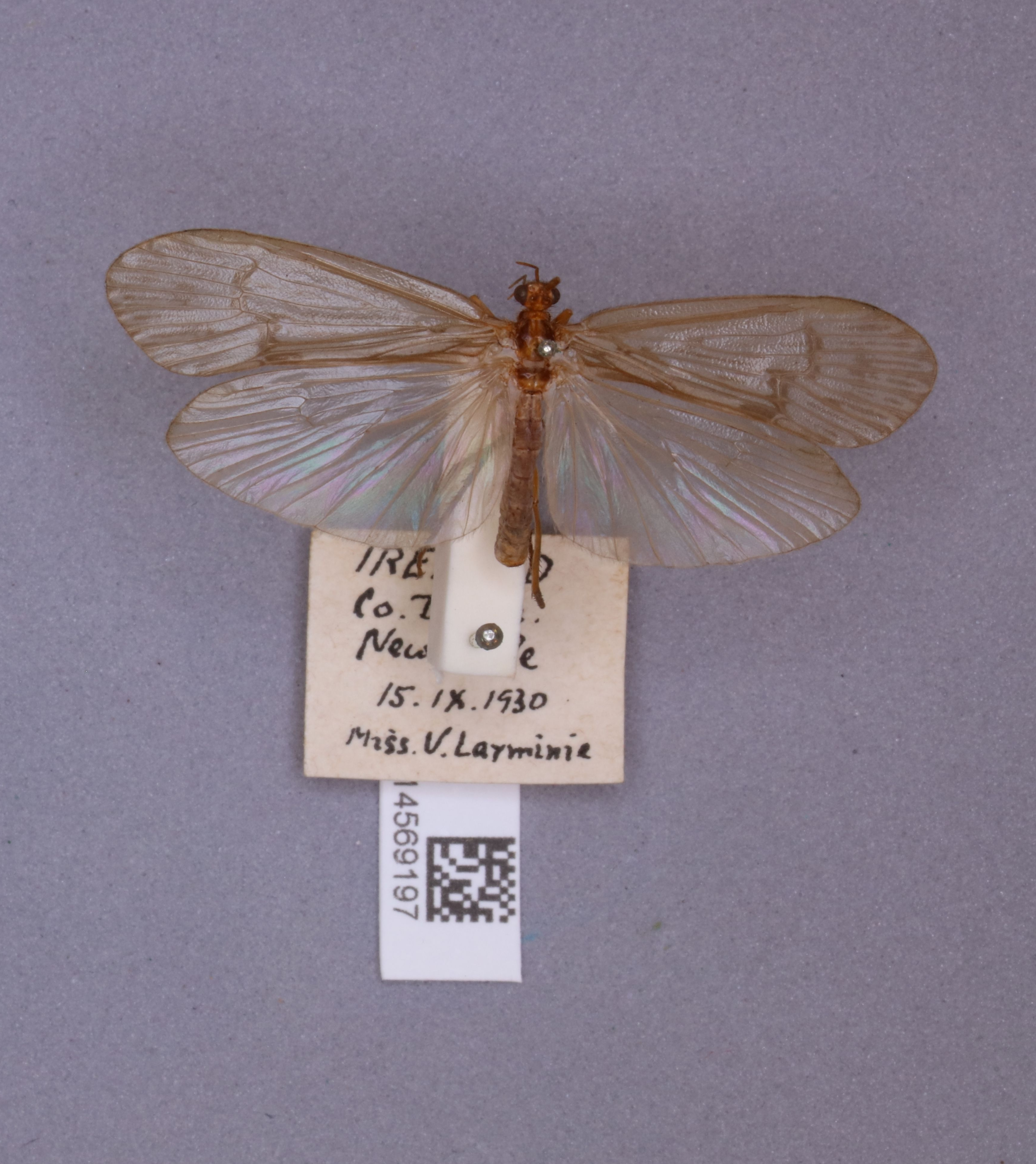
a preserved specimen of the caddisfly species Halesus radiatus, collected by Miss V. Larminie at Newcastle, County Down, Ireland in 1930 (NHMUK014569197)

In 1921, Larminie attempted to emigrate to Canada to work as a smallholder and beekeeper, although initially she had been offered employment as a secretary at the Womans Hospital in Halifax, Nova Scotia. She returned to the U.K. after about a year. Larminie did not lose her interest in insects and in 1930 she recorded the caddisfly species Halesus radiatus in County Down, Ireland which was quoted in a scientific paper by Douglas Kimmins in 1932.

In 1932, Larminie moved into accommodation run by Women's Pioneer Housing, 65 Harrington Gardens in Kensington, staying there until about 1937, when she moved to Putney to live with her sister Margaret, who had by then divorced her husband Robert Tragett.

On the 1939 register of England, Larminie was listed as living on independent means in Richmond and working as an unpaid scientific card indexer at the British Museum (Natural History).

In later life, Larminie lived at Bexhill-on-Sea, and she died at Hastings on 12 June 1964.

== Works ==
- 1904: (as translator from the French original): Dr. J. Grasset: The History of a Haunted House: Proceedings of the Society of Psychical Research: part XLIX: October 1904: supplement I: pp. 464–480
- 1918: (with Margaret Rivers Larminie): Out of the East: And Other Poems: Adventurers All: A Series of Young Poets Unknown to Fame (no. 17), B.H. Blackwell.
