= International Association of Oil & Gas Producers =

Petroleum industry global forum

- Abbreviation: IOGP
- Formation: 1974
- Headquarters: London, United Kingdom
- Website: https://www.iogp.org/

The International Association of Oil & Gas Producers (IOGP) is the petroleum industry's global forum in which members identify and share best practices to achieve improvements in health, safety, the environment, security, social responsibility, engineering and operations.

The association was formed in London in 1974 to develop effective communications between the upstream industry and the network of international regulators. Originally called the E&P Forum (for oil and gas exploration and production), in 1999 the current name was adopted. Most of the world’s leading publicly traded, private and state-owned oil & gas companies, oil & gas associations and major upstream service companies are members. The IOGP claims its members produce 40% of the world’s oil and gas.

== Co-operation with other bodies ==
IOGP also represent the interests of the upstream industry before international regulators and legislators in UN bodies such as the International Maritime Organization and the Commission for Sustainable Development. IOGP also works with the World Bank and with the International Organization for Standardization (ISO). It is also accredited to a range of regional bodies that include OSPAR, the Helsinki Commission and the Barcelona Convention, and provides a conduit for advocacy and debate between the upstream industry and the European Union (EU). This involves regular contact with the European Commission and the European Parliament.

== IOGP data reports ==
Every year, IOGP collects and publishes data on upstream operations worldwide, both onshore and offshore, from participating member companies and their contractor employees. The reports are free and publicly available. The data covers:

- Occupational safety
- Environmental performance
- Process safety events
- Health management
- Land transport safety
- Aviation safety

Occupational safety:

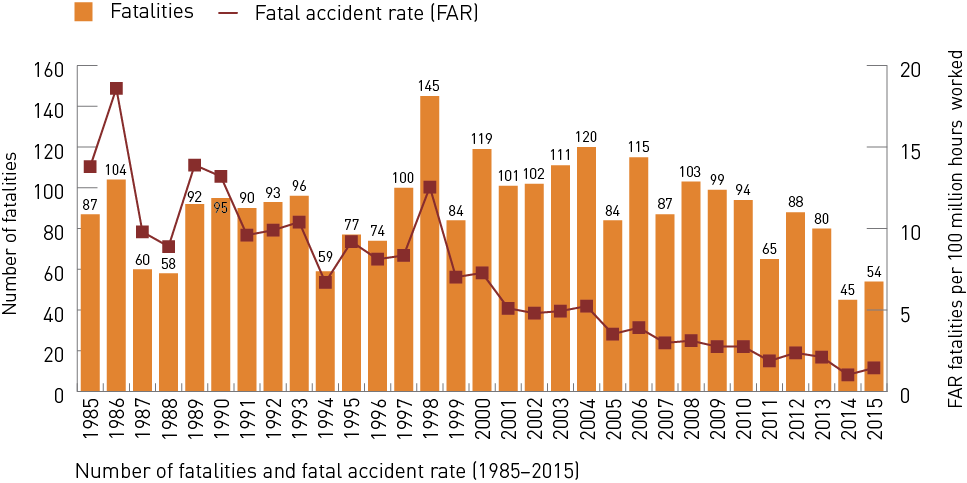
Fatalities and FAR graph (1985 - 2015)

Since 1985, when IOGP started reporting annual trends in upstream safety data, there have been considerable improvements in industry performance.

Today, it is the industry’s largest database of safety performance, covering participating member company employees and their contractors onshore and offshore, worldwide. Fatal incidents are analysed by incident category, activity and associated causal factors, and incident descriptions are provided for fatal incidents and high potential events.

Environmental performance:
IOGP has collected and published environmental data from its participating member companies on an annual basis since 2001. The objectives of this programme are to allow member companies to compare their performance with other companies in the sector; and increase transparency of industry operations. The reports aggregate information at both global and regional levels, expressed within six environmental indicator categories:

- Gaseous emissions
- Energy consumption
- Flaring
- Aqueous discharges
- Non-aqueous drilling fluids retained on cuttings discharged to sea
- Spills of oil and chemicals

Process safety events:
Process safety is a disciplined framework for managing the integrity of operating systems and processes that handle hazardous substances. It relies on good design principles, engineering and operating and maintenance practices. The process safety events (PSE) data are based on the numbers of Tier 1 and Tier 2 process safety events reported by participating IOGP member companies, separately for:

- Onshore and offshore
- Drilling and production
- Activities
- Consequences
- Material released

The data are normalized against work hours associated with drilling and production activities to provide PSE rates.

Health management:
IOGP (with IPIECA) has developed two tools to assess health leading performance indicators within individual companies. These enable performance comparison between different parts of a company and between participating companies. The annual health leading performance indicators report illustrates the results submitted by participating companies for both tools and includes actual anonymous results for the year by company, trends over time and the potential benefits to health management in the industry. Land transport safety In April 2005, IOGP published Report No. 365, Land transportation safety recommended practice, a guideline designed to be applicable to all land transportation activities in the upstream oil and gas industry, including operators, contractors and subcontractors. IOGP collects data on motor vehicle crashes and information submitted by participating member companies are published from 2008 onwards. Data are broken down by region and crash category. Data are further grouped to indicate the number of crashes that resulted in a rollover. This includes:

- Number of Motor Vehicle Crash (MVC) fatalities
- Number of Motor Vehicle Crashes for each reporting group and category
- Motor vehicle crash rate (Motor Vehicle Crashes per million kilometres) for each reporting group and category.

== Global Production Report ==
IOGP publishes a Global Production Report. First published in 2018 it is updated annually. It is based on the latest BP Statistical Review of World Energy and establishes an IOGP Production Indicator© (PI) – the level at which a region is able to meet its own oil or gas demand – for seven regions across the world. A PI higher than 100% means the region produces more than it needs to meet its own requirements and so can export.

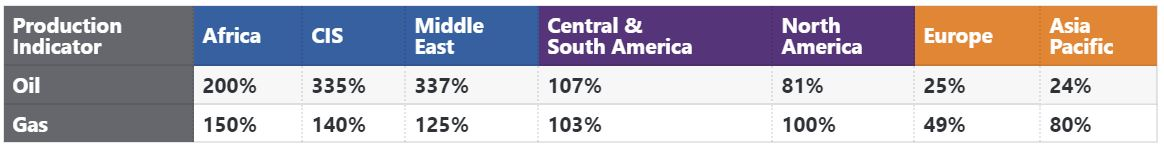
IOGP production indicators for oil and gas in seven regions.

The main conclusion of the report is that demand growth and the annual depletion rate of 6% of existing fields are driving the need for investment to gain additional volumes. Such investment will depend on regional and local policies that encourage responsible resource development.

== European Petroleum Survey Group ==
In 2005, IOGP absorbed the European Petroleum Survey Group or EPSG (1986–2005) into its structure as IOGP Geomatics Committee. EPSG was a scientific organization with ties to the European petroleum industry consisting of specialists working in applied geodesy, surveying, and cartography related to oil exploration. The EPSG Geodetic Parameter Dataset is a widely used database of Earth ellipsoids, geodetic datums, geographic and projected coordinate systems, units of measurement, etc, which was originally created by EPSG and still carries the EPSG initials to this day.

== IOGP Outstanding Young Professional Award (OYPA) ==
The award, in association with the biennial SPE HSSE-SR International Conference, recognizes the achievements of an individual with fewer than 10 years of professional E&P experience, who demonstrates professional accomplishments and evidence of outstanding talent, dedication and leadership in at least one aspect of health, safety, security, the environment and/or social responsibility.

2020 winner:

- David Ochanda, Biodiversity Coordinator, Total (Kampala, Uganda)

Finalists:

- Kelly Giang, Subsea Engineer, BP (Houston, USA)
- Delina Lyon, Ecotoxicologist, Shell (Houston, USA)
- Saul Moorhouse, Technology Capability Lead, BP (London, UK)
- Lauren Prigent, HSE Advisor, Neptune Energy (Aberdeen, UK)
- Stephanie Seewald, Drilling & Completions HSE Team Lead, Chevron (Houston, USA)
- Xeniya Yurkavets, Lead HSE Specialist, KazMunayGas (Nur-Sultan, Kazakhstan)

Extracts of their presentations can be viewed at IOGP's OYPA webpage.

2018 winner: Marcin Nazaruk, BP. Finalists: Mohammed A. Al-Ghazal, Saudi Aramco; Jessica Guzzetta-King, Genesis; Cedric Michel, Total; Natasha Sihota, Chevron; Josh R Townsend, BP.

2016 winner: Muriel Barnier, Schlumberger. Finalists: Yu Chen, CNOOC; Bev Coleman, Chevron; Omar De Leon, ExxonMobil; and Emma Thomson, BP.
