= IPIECA =

Non-profit gas industry association (est. 1974)

Ipieca
- Formation: 1974
- Purpose: The global oil and gas association for advancing environmental and social performance across the energy transition
- Headquarters: London, United Kingdom
- CEO: Brian Sullivan
- Website: https://www.ipieca.org/

Ipieca is a global not-for-profit oil and gas industry association for environmental and social issues, headquartered in London. The association was established in 1974 at the request of the United Nations Environment Programme (UNEP) as the International Petroleum Industry Environmental Conservation Association and changed its name in 2002.

Company members contribute to Ipieca's budget according to an individually agreed percentage based on the volume of crude oil produced and petroleum products sold by each company and the number of geographical areas where the company has interests.

Ipieca is the industry channel into UN's Intergovernmental Panel on Climate Change (IPCC) and the United Nations Framework Convention on Climate Change (UNFCCC), both concerned with climate change.

Its geographical coverage encompasses North America, Latin America, the Caribbean, Asia and the Pacific, Africa, Western and Eastern Europe and the global energy market.

Beginning in the 1980s, the organization was involved in efforts to dispute climate science and weaken international climate policy.

== See also ==
- International Association of Oil & Gas Producers, set up at the same time and in the same place
